

101001–101100 

|-bgcolor=#fefefe
| 101001 ||  || — || August 17, 1998 || Socorro || LINEAR || — || align=right | 2.6 km || 
|-id=002 bgcolor=#fefefe
| 101002 ||  || — || August 17, 1998 || Socorro || LINEAR || — || align=right | 1.2 km || 
|-id=003 bgcolor=#fefefe
| 101003 ||  || — || August 17, 1998 || Socorro || LINEAR || — || align=right | 1.6 km || 
|-id=004 bgcolor=#E9E9E9
| 101004 ||  || — || August 17, 1998 || Socorro || LINEAR || — || align=right | 1.7 km || 
|-id=005 bgcolor=#fefefe
| 101005 ||  || — || August 17, 1998 || Socorro || LINEAR || FLO || align=right | 1.4 km || 
|-id=006 bgcolor=#E9E9E9
| 101006 ||  || — || August 17, 1998 || Socorro || LINEAR || — || align=right | 3.2 km || 
|-id=007 bgcolor=#fefefe
| 101007 ||  || — || August 17, 1998 || Socorro || LINEAR || — || align=right | 2.1 km || 
|-id=008 bgcolor=#fefefe
| 101008 ||  || — || August 17, 1998 || Socorro || LINEAR || — || align=right | 1.3 km || 
|-id=009 bgcolor=#fefefe
| 101009 ||  || — || August 17, 1998 || Socorro || LINEAR || — || align=right | 2.0 km || 
|-id=010 bgcolor=#fefefe
| 101010 ||  || — || August 17, 1998 || Socorro || LINEAR || — || align=right | 1.7 km || 
|-id=011 bgcolor=#fefefe
| 101011 ||  || — || August 17, 1998 || Socorro || LINEAR || — || align=right | 2.1 km || 
|-id=012 bgcolor=#fefefe
| 101012 ||  || — || August 17, 1998 || Socorro || LINEAR || — || align=right | 2.1 km || 
|-id=013 bgcolor=#E9E9E9
| 101013 ||  || — || August 20, 1998 || Anderson Mesa || LONEOS || — || align=right | 5.2 km || 
|-id=014 bgcolor=#fefefe
| 101014 ||  || — || August 27, 1998 || Anderson Mesa || LONEOS || FLO || align=right | 1.4 km || 
|-id=015 bgcolor=#E9E9E9
| 101015 ||  || — || August 27, 1998 || Anderson Mesa || LONEOS || GER || align=right | 2.8 km || 
|-id=016 bgcolor=#E9E9E9
| 101016 ||  || — || August 26, 1998 || Caussols || ODAS || — || align=right | 5.4 km || 
|-id=017 bgcolor=#fefefe
| 101017 ||  || — || August 30, 1998 || Kitt Peak || Spacewatch || MAS || align=right | 1.2 km || 
|-id=018 bgcolor=#E9E9E9
| 101018 ||  || — || August 30, 1998 || Kitt Peak || Spacewatch || — || align=right | 4.9 km || 
|-id=019 bgcolor=#E9E9E9
| 101019 ||  || — || August 30, 1998 || Kitt Peak || Spacewatch || — || align=right | 2.1 km || 
|-id=020 bgcolor=#E9E9E9
| 101020 ||  || — || August 26, 1998 || Kitt Peak || Spacewatch || — || align=right | 4.1 km || 
|-id=021 bgcolor=#E9E9E9
| 101021 ||  || — || August 26, 1998 || Kitt Peak || Spacewatch || — || align=right | 3.5 km || 
|-id=022 bgcolor=#E9E9E9
| 101022 ||  || — || August 26, 1998 || Kitt Peak || Spacewatch || — || align=right | 2.3 km || 
|-id=023 bgcolor=#d6d6d6
| 101023 ||  || — || August 23, 1998 || Anderson Mesa || LONEOS || EOS || align=right | 4.7 km || 
|-id=024 bgcolor=#fefefe
| 101024 ||  || — || August 29, 1998 || Anderson Mesa || LONEOS || NYS || align=right | 1.6 km || 
|-id=025 bgcolor=#E9E9E9
| 101025 ||  || — || August 30, 1998 || Bergisch Gladbach || W. Bickel || — || align=right | 1.8 km || 
|-id=026 bgcolor=#fefefe
| 101026 ||  || — || August 30, 1998 || Xinglong || SCAP || — || align=right | 1.7 km || 
|-id=027 bgcolor=#FA8072
| 101027 ||  || — || August 24, 1998 || Socorro || LINEAR || — || align=right | 2.2 km || 
|-id=028 bgcolor=#E9E9E9
| 101028 ||  || — || August 24, 1998 || Socorro || LINEAR || — || align=right | 5.6 km || 
|-id=029 bgcolor=#fefefe
| 101029 ||  || — || August 24, 1998 || Socorro || LINEAR || — || align=right | 2.3 km || 
|-id=030 bgcolor=#E9E9E9
| 101030 ||  || — || August 24, 1998 || Socorro || LINEAR || — || align=right | 2.9 km || 
|-id=031 bgcolor=#fefefe
| 101031 ||  || — || August 24, 1998 || Socorro || LINEAR || V || align=right | 1.4 km || 
|-id=032 bgcolor=#E9E9E9
| 101032 ||  || — || August 24, 1998 || Socorro || LINEAR || — || align=right | 5.2 km || 
|-id=033 bgcolor=#E9E9E9
| 101033 ||  || — || August 24, 1998 || Socorro || LINEAR || GEF || align=right | 2.9 km || 
|-id=034 bgcolor=#fefefe
| 101034 ||  || — || August 24, 1998 || Socorro || LINEAR || — || align=right | 2.0 km || 
|-id=035 bgcolor=#fefefe
| 101035 ||  || — || August 24, 1998 || Socorro || LINEAR || — || align=right | 2.2 km || 
|-id=036 bgcolor=#E9E9E9
| 101036 ||  || — || August 24, 1998 || Socorro || LINEAR || — || align=right | 6.4 km || 
|-id=037 bgcolor=#FA8072
| 101037 ||  || — || August 28, 1998 || Socorro || LINEAR || — || align=right | 1.7 km || 
|-id=038 bgcolor=#d6d6d6
| 101038 ||  || — || August 19, 1998 || Socorro || LINEAR || Tj (2.92) || align=right | 3.7 km || 
|-id=039 bgcolor=#E9E9E9
| 101039 ||  || — || August 24, 1998 || Socorro || LINEAR || JUN || align=right | 2.2 km || 
|-id=040 bgcolor=#E9E9E9
| 101040 ||  || — || August 28, 1998 || Socorro || LINEAR || — || align=right | 2.9 km || 
|-id=041 bgcolor=#fefefe
| 101041 ||  || — || August 31, 1998 || Kleť || Kleť Obs. || — || align=right | 3.2 km || 
|-id=042 bgcolor=#fefefe
| 101042 ||  || — || August 26, 1998 || La Silla || E. W. Elst || FLO || align=right | 1.6 km || 
|-id=043 bgcolor=#fefefe
| 101043 ||  || — || August 26, 1998 || La Silla || E. W. Elst || NYS || align=right | 1.6 km || 
|-id=044 bgcolor=#fefefe
| 101044 ||  || — || August 26, 1998 || La Silla || E. W. Elst || NYS || align=right | 1.3 km || 
|-id=045 bgcolor=#fefefe
| 101045 ||  || — || August 26, 1998 || La Silla || E. W. Elst || — || align=right | 2.5 km || 
|-id=046 bgcolor=#E9E9E9
| 101046 ||  || — || August 26, 1998 || La Silla || E. W. Elst || — || align=right | 3.6 km || 
|-id=047 bgcolor=#fefefe
| 101047 ||  || — || August 26, 1998 || La Silla || E. W. Elst || NYS || align=right | 1.5 km || 
|-id=048 bgcolor=#fefefe
| 101048 ||  || — || August 26, 1998 || La Silla || E. W. Elst || — || align=right | 1.8 km || 
|-id=049 bgcolor=#fefefe
| 101049 ||  || — || August 25, 1998 || La Silla || E. W. Elst || — || align=right | 1.6 km || 
|-id=050 bgcolor=#fefefe
| 101050 ||  || — || August 25, 1998 || La Silla || E. W. Elst || — || align=right | 1.4 km || 
|-id=051 bgcolor=#fefefe
| 101051 ||  || — || August 25, 1998 || La Silla || E. W. Elst || — || align=right | 2.4 km || 
|-id=052 bgcolor=#fefefe
| 101052 ||  || — || August 17, 1998 || Socorro || LINEAR || — || align=right | 1.4 km || 
|-id=053 bgcolor=#E9E9E9
| 101053 ||  || — || August 26, 1998 || Anderson Mesa || LONEOS || GEF || align=right | 2.4 km || 
|-id=054 bgcolor=#E9E9E9
| 101054 ||  || — || August 26, 1998 || Anderson Mesa || LONEOS || — || align=right | 1.4 km || 
|-id=055 bgcolor=#fefefe
| 101055 || 1998 RL || — || September 1, 1998 || Xinglong || SCAP || FLO || align=right | 1.4 km || 
|-id=056 bgcolor=#fefefe
| 101056 ||  || — || September 10, 1998 || Višnjan Observatory || Višnjan Obs. || — || align=right | 1.7 km || 
|-id=057 bgcolor=#E9E9E9
| 101057 ||  || — || September 15, 1998 || Kitt Peak || Spacewatch || — || align=right | 2.8 km || 
|-id=058 bgcolor=#FA8072
| 101058 ||  || — || September 14, 1998 || Socorro || LINEAR || unusual || align=right | 4.7 km || 
|-id=059 bgcolor=#fefefe
| 101059 ||  || — || September 14, 1998 || Socorro || LINEAR || H || align=right | 1.1 km || 
|-id=060 bgcolor=#fefefe
| 101060 ||  || — || September 14, 1998 || Socorro || LINEAR || — || align=right | 4.1 km || 
|-id=061 bgcolor=#fefefe
| 101061 ||  || — || September 14, 1998 || Socorro || LINEAR || PHO || align=right | 4.2 km || 
|-id=062 bgcolor=#fefefe
| 101062 ||  || — || September 15, 1998 || Caussols || ODAS || — || align=right | 1.7 km || 
|-id=063 bgcolor=#E9E9E9
| 101063 ||  || — || September 14, 1998 || Anderson Mesa || LONEOS || — || align=right | 2.5 km || 
|-id=064 bgcolor=#E9E9E9
| 101064 ||  || — || September 12, 1998 || Kitt Peak || Spacewatch || — || align=right | 5.7 km || 
|-id=065 bgcolor=#fefefe
| 101065 ||  || — || September 13, 1998 || Kitt Peak || Spacewatch || — || align=right | 2.8 km || 
|-id=066 bgcolor=#E9E9E9
| 101066 ||  || — || September 13, 1998 || Kitt Peak || Spacewatch || — || align=right | 4.2 km || 
|-id=067 bgcolor=#E9E9E9
| 101067 ||  || — || September 14, 1998 || Kitt Peak || Spacewatch || PAD || align=right | 4.1 km || 
|-id=068 bgcolor=#E9E9E9
| 101068 ||  || — || September 14, 1998 || Kitt Peak || Spacewatch || — || align=right | 3.6 km || 
|-id=069 bgcolor=#fefefe
| 101069 ||  || — || September 15, 1998 || Kitt Peak || Spacewatch || — || align=right | 2.1 km || 
|-id=070 bgcolor=#fefefe
| 101070 ||  || — || September 14, 1998 || Xinglong || SCAP || ERI || align=right | 1.5 km || 
|-id=071 bgcolor=#fefefe
| 101071 ||  || — || September 14, 1998 || Socorro || LINEAR || — || align=right | 1.9 km || 
|-id=072 bgcolor=#E9E9E9
| 101072 ||  || — || September 14, 1998 || Socorro || LINEAR || — || align=right | 1.6 km || 
|-id=073 bgcolor=#fefefe
| 101073 ||  || — || September 14, 1998 || Socorro || LINEAR || — || align=right | 1.7 km || 
|-id=074 bgcolor=#fefefe
| 101074 ||  || — || September 14, 1998 || Socorro || LINEAR || V || align=right | 1.7 km || 
|-id=075 bgcolor=#E9E9E9
| 101075 ||  || — || September 13, 1998 || Anderson Mesa || LONEOS || — || align=right | 3.1 km || 
|-id=076 bgcolor=#d6d6d6
| 101076 ||  || — || September 15, 1998 || Kitt Peak || Spacewatch || — || align=right | 3.7 km || 
|-id=077 bgcolor=#E9E9E9
| 101077 ||  || — || September 14, 1998 || Socorro || LINEAR || EUN || align=right | 2.1 km || 
|-id=078 bgcolor=#fefefe
| 101078 ||  || — || September 14, 1998 || Socorro || LINEAR || — || align=right | 1.7 km || 
|-id=079 bgcolor=#fefefe
| 101079 ||  || — || September 14, 1998 || Socorro || LINEAR || V || align=right | 1.3 km || 
|-id=080 bgcolor=#E9E9E9
| 101080 ||  || — || September 14, 1998 || Socorro || LINEAR || — || align=right | 4.6 km || 
|-id=081 bgcolor=#fefefe
| 101081 ||  || — || September 14, 1998 || Socorro || LINEAR || FLO || align=right | 1.1 km || 
|-id=082 bgcolor=#E9E9E9
| 101082 ||  || — || September 14, 1998 || Socorro || LINEAR || — || align=right | 3.0 km || 
|-id=083 bgcolor=#d6d6d6
| 101083 ||  || — || September 14, 1998 || Socorro || LINEAR || — || align=right | 4.8 km || 
|-id=084 bgcolor=#fefefe
| 101084 ||  || — || September 14, 1998 || Socorro || LINEAR || FLO || align=right | 2.0 km || 
|-id=085 bgcolor=#fefefe
| 101085 ||  || — || September 14, 1998 || Socorro || LINEAR || NYS || align=right | 1.5 km || 
|-id=086 bgcolor=#d6d6d6
| 101086 ||  || — || September 14, 1998 || Socorro || LINEAR || HYG || align=right | 5.9 km || 
|-id=087 bgcolor=#E9E9E9
| 101087 ||  || — || September 14, 1998 || Socorro || LINEAR || — || align=right | 4.5 km || 
|-id=088 bgcolor=#fefefe
| 101088 ||  || — || September 14, 1998 || Socorro || LINEAR || FLO || align=right | 2.0 km || 
|-id=089 bgcolor=#E9E9E9
| 101089 ||  || — || September 14, 1998 || Socorro || LINEAR || — || align=right | 1.8 km || 
|-id=090 bgcolor=#E9E9E9
| 101090 ||  || — || September 14, 1998 || Socorro || LINEAR || CLO || align=right | 6.1 km || 
|-id=091 bgcolor=#fefefe
| 101091 ||  || — || September 14, 1998 || Socorro || LINEAR || FLO || align=right | 2.1 km || 
|-id=092 bgcolor=#fefefe
| 101092 ||  || — || September 14, 1998 || Socorro || LINEAR || MAS || align=right | 1.2 km || 
|-id=093 bgcolor=#fefefe
| 101093 ||  || — || September 14, 1998 || Socorro || LINEAR || NYS || align=right | 1.4 km || 
|-id=094 bgcolor=#E9E9E9
| 101094 ||  || — || September 14, 1998 || Socorro || LINEAR || — || align=right | 2.6 km || 
|-id=095 bgcolor=#fefefe
| 101095 ||  || — || September 14, 1998 || Socorro || LINEAR || V || align=right | 1.3 km || 
|-id=096 bgcolor=#E9E9E9
| 101096 ||  || — || September 14, 1998 || Socorro || LINEAR || — || align=right | 1.6 km || 
|-id=097 bgcolor=#fefefe
| 101097 ||  || — || September 14, 1998 || Socorro || LINEAR || — || align=right | 1.7 km || 
|-id=098 bgcolor=#fefefe
| 101098 ||  || — || September 14, 1998 || Socorro || LINEAR || — || align=right | 1.6 km || 
|-id=099 bgcolor=#d6d6d6
| 101099 ||  || — || September 14, 1998 || Socorro || LINEAR || — || align=right | 5.1 km || 
|-id=100 bgcolor=#E9E9E9
| 101100 ||  || — || September 14, 1998 || Socorro || LINEAR || RAF || align=right | 1.4 km || 
|}

101101–101200 

|-bgcolor=#fefefe
| 101101 ||  || — || September 14, 1998 || Socorro || LINEAR || FLO || align=right | 2.3 km || 
|-id=102 bgcolor=#E9E9E9
| 101102 ||  || — || September 14, 1998 || Socorro || LINEAR || — || align=right | 1.8 km || 
|-id=103 bgcolor=#d6d6d6
| 101103 ||  || — || September 14, 1998 || Socorro || LINEAR || — || align=right | 4.5 km || 
|-id=104 bgcolor=#E9E9E9
| 101104 ||  || — || September 14, 1998 || Socorro || LINEAR || — || align=right | 4.4 km || 
|-id=105 bgcolor=#fefefe
| 101105 ||  || — || September 14, 1998 || Socorro || LINEAR || — || align=right | 1.8 km || 
|-id=106 bgcolor=#E9E9E9
| 101106 ||  || — || September 14, 1998 || Socorro || LINEAR || — || align=right | 4.1 km || 
|-id=107 bgcolor=#E9E9E9
| 101107 ||  || — || September 14, 1998 || Socorro || LINEAR || — || align=right | 3.0 km || 
|-id=108 bgcolor=#fefefe
| 101108 ||  || — || September 14, 1998 || Socorro || LINEAR || — || align=right | 1.7 km || 
|-id=109 bgcolor=#E9E9E9
| 101109 ||  || — || September 14, 1998 || Socorro || LINEAR || — || align=right | 2.8 km || 
|-id=110 bgcolor=#E9E9E9
| 101110 ||  || — || September 14, 1998 || Socorro || LINEAR || — || align=right | 1.8 km || 
|-id=111 bgcolor=#E9E9E9
| 101111 ||  || — || September 14, 1998 || Socorro || LINEAR || — || align=right | 4.8 km || 
|-id=112 bgcolor=#E9E9E9
| 101112 ||  || — || September 14, 1998 || Socorro || LINEAR || — || align=right | 1.7 km || 
|-id=113 bgcolor=#fefefe
| 101113 ||  || — || September 14, 1998 || Socorro || LINEAR || — || align=right | 1.6 km || 
|-id=114 bgcolor=#E9E9E9
| 101114 ||  || — || September 14, 1998 || Socorro || LINEAR || — || align=right | 2.4 km || 
|-id=115 bgcolor=#E9E9E9
| 101115 ||  || — || September 14, 1998 || Socorro || LINEAR || — || align=right | 2.4 km || 
|-id=116 bgcolor=#E9E9E9
| 101116 ||  || — || September 14, 1998 || Socorro || LINEAR || — || align=right | 2.8 km || 
|-id=117 bgcolor=#E9E9E9
| 101117 ||  || — || September 14, 1998 || Socorro || LINEAR || — || align=right | 1.6 km || 
|-id=118 bgcolor=#fefefe
| 101118 ||  || — || September 14, 1998 || Socorro || LINEAR || NYS || align=right | 1.2 km || 
|-id=119 bgcolor=#fefefe
| 101119 ||  || — || September 14, 1998 || Socorro || LINEAR || — || align=right | 1.6 km || 
|-id=120 bgcolor=#fefefe
| 101120 ||  || — || September 14, 1998 || Socorro || LINEAR || FLO || align=right | 1.5 km || 
|-id=121 bgcolor=#fefefe
| 101121 ||  || — || September 14, 1998 || Socorro || LINEAR || FLO || align=right | 1.7 km || 
|-id=122 bgcolor=#fefefe
| 101122 ||  || — || September 14, 1998 || Socorro || LINEAR || V || align=right | 1.6 km || 
|-id=123 bgcolor=#E9E9E9
| 101123 ||  || — || September 14, 1998 || Socorro || LINEAR || — || align=right | 3.8 km || 
|-id=124 bgcolor=#E9E9E9
| 101124 ||  || — || September 14, 1998 || Socorro || LINEAR || — || align=right | 2.8 km || 
|-id=125 bgcolor=#fefefe
| 101125 ||  || — || September 14, 1998 || Socorro || LINEAR || — || align=right | 1.4 km || 
|-id=126 bgcolor=#fefefe
| 101126 ||  || — || September 14, 1998 || Socorro || LINEAR || FLO || align=right | 1.4 km || 
|-id=127 bgcolor=#fefefe
| 101127 ||  || — || September 14, 1998 || Socorro || LINEAR || — || align=right | 1.2 km || 
|-id=128 bgcolor=#fefefe
| 101128 ||  || — || September 14, 1998 || Socorro || LINEAR || — || align=right | 1.7 km || 
|-id=129 bgcolor=#fefefe
| 101129 ||  || — || September 14, 1998 || Socorro || LINEAR || NYS || align=right | 1.2 km || 
|-id=130 bgcolor=#E9E9E9
| 101130 ||  || — || September 14, 1998 || Socorro || LINEAR || — || align=right | 2.0 km || 
|-id=131 bgcolor=#E9E9E9
| 101131 ||  || — || September 14, 1998 || Socorro || LINEAR || EUN || align=right | 2.4 km || 
|-id=132 bgcolor=#fefefe
| 101132 ||  || — || September 14, 1998 || Socorro || LINEAR || FLO || align=right | 1.5 km || 
|-id=133 bgcolor=#fefefe
| 101133 ||  || — || September 14, 1998 || Socorro || LINEAR || ERI || align=right | 3.6 km || 
|-id=134 bgcolor=#fefefe
| 101134 ||  || — || September 14, 1998 || Socorro || LINEAR || FLO || align=right | 1.5 km || 
|-id=135 bgcolor=#fefefe
| 101135 ||  || — || September 14, 1998 || Socorro || LINEAR || — || align=right | 1.6 km || 
|-id=136 bgcolor=#E9E9E9
| 101136 ||  || — || September 14, 1998 || Socorro || LINEAR || — || align=right | 3.9 km || 
|-id=137 bgcolor=#fefefe
| 101137 ||  || — || September 14, 1998 || Socorro || LINEAR || — || align=right | 1.3 km || 
|-id=138 bgcolor=#fefefe
| 101138 ||  || — || September 14, 1998 || Socorro || LINEAR || — || align=right | 3.2 km || 
|-id=139 bgcolor=#fefefe
| 101139 ||  || — || September 14, 1998 || Socorro || LINEAR || — || align=right | 2.0 km || 
|-id=140 bgcolor=#E9E9E9
| 101140 ||  || — || September 14, 1998 || Socorro || LINEAR || MIS || align=right | 3.4 km || 
|-id=141 bgcolor=#E9E9E9
| 101141 ||  || — || September 14, 1998 || Socorro || LINEAR || — || align=right | 1.8 km || 
|-id=142 bgcolor=#E9E9E9
| 101142 ||  || — || September 14, 1998 || Socorro || LINEAR || — || align=right | 3.7 km || 
|-id=143 bgcolor=#E9E9E9
| 101143 ||  || — || September 14, 1998 || Socorro || LINEAR || — || align=right | 3.4 km || 
|-id=144 bgcolor=#E9E9E9
| 101144 ||  || — || September 14, 1998 || Socorro || LINEAR || — || align=right | 4.8 km || 
|-id=145 bgcolor=#fefefe
| 101145 ||  || — || September 14, 1998 || Socorro || LINEAR || NYS || align=right | 1.6 km || 
|-id=146 bgcolor=#d6d6d6
| 101146 ||  || — || September 14, 1998 || Socorro || LINEAR || — || align=right | 2.2 km || 
|-id=147 bgcolor=#fefefe
| 101147 ||  || — || September 14, 1998 || Socorro || LINEAR || FLO || align=right | 1.5 km || 
|-id=148 bgcolor=#fefefe
| 101148 ||  || — || September 14, 1998 || Socorro || LINEAR || — || align=right | 1.7 km || 
|-id=149 bgcolor=#E9E9E9
| 101149 ||  || — || September 14, 1998 || Socorro || LINEAR || — || align=right | 2.0 km || 
|-id=150 bgcolor=#fefefe
| 101150 ||  || — || September 14, 1998 || Socorro || LINEAR || — || align=right | 1.8 km || 
|-id=151 bgcolor=#E9E9E9
| 101151 ||  || — || September 14, 1998 || Socorro || LINEAR || — || align=right | 2.0 km || 
|-id=152 bgcolor=#fefefe
| 101152 ||  || — || September 14, 1998 || Socorro || LINEAR || EUT || align=right | 1.4 km || 
|-id=153 bgcolor=#d6d6d6
| 101153 ||  || — || September 14, 1998 || Socorro || LINEAR || HIL3:2 || align=right | 10 km || 
|-id=154 bgcolor=#fefefe
| 101154 ||  || — || September 14, 1998 || Socorro || LINEAR || FLO || align=right | 1.7 km || 
|-id=155 bgcolor=#fefefe
| 101155 ||  || — || September 14, 1998 || Socorro || LINEAR || — || align=right | 1.8 km || 
|-id=156 bgcolor=#E9E9E9
| 101156 ||  || — || September 14, 1998 || Socorro || LINEAR || RAF || align=right | 1.9 km || 
|-id=157 bgcolor=#E9E9E9
| 101157 ||  || — || September 14, 1998 || Socorro || LINEAR || — || align=right | 2.6 km || 
|-id=158 bgcolor=#FA8072
| 101158 ||  || — || September 14, 1998 || Socorro || LINEAR || — || align=right | 1.5 km || 
|-id=159 bgcolor=#fefefe
| 101159 ||  || — || September 14, 1998 || Socorro || LINEAR || — || align=right | 1.8 km || 
|-id=160 bgcolor=#E9E9E9
| 101160 ||  || — || September 14, 1998 || Socorro || LINEAR || MAR || align=right | 1.8 km || 
|-id=161 bgcolor=#fefefe
| 101161 ||  || — || September 14, 1998 || Socorro || LINEAR || NYS || align=right | 3.2 km || 
|-id=162 bgcolor=#fefefe
| 101162 ||  || — || September 14, 1998 || Socorro || LINEAR || — || align=right | 1.6 km || 
|-id=163 bgcolor=#E9E9E9
| 101163 ||  || — || September 14, 1998 || Socorro || LINEAR || — || align=right | 1.8 km || 
|-id=164 bgcolor=#E9E9E9
| 101164 ||  || — || September 14, 1998 || Socorro || LINEAR || — || align=right | 2.1 km || 
|-id=165 bgcolor=#E9E9E9
| 101165 || 1998 SS || — || September 16, 1998 || Caussols || ODAS || — || align=right | 4.5 km || 
|-id=166 bgcolor=#fefefe
| 101166 ||  || — || September 16, 1998 || Caussols || ODAS || FLO || align=right | 1.4 km || 
|-id=167 bgcolor=#fefefe
| 101167 ||  || — || September 19, 1998 || Catalina || CSS || — || align=right | 2.8 km || 
|-id=168 bgcolor=#fefefe
| 101168 ||  || — || September 18, 1998 || Socorro || LINEAR || — || align=right | 3.2 km || 
|-id=169 bgcolor=#fefefe
| 101169 ||  || — || September 18, 1998 || Caussols || ODAS || — || align=right | 1.9 km || 
|-id=170 bgcolor=#fefefe
| 101170 ||  || — || September 18, 1998 || Caussols || ODAS || NYS || align=right | 1.4 km || 
|-id=171 bgcolor=#fefefe
| 101171 ||  || — || September 18, 1998 || Caussols || ODAS || MAS || align=right | 1.7 km || 
|-id=172 bgcolor=#E9E9E9
| 101172 ||  || — || September 19, 1998 || Prescott || P. G. Comba || — || align=right | 2.6 km || 
|-id=173 bgcolor=#fefefe
| 101173 ||  || — || September 17, 1998 || Anderson Mesa || LONEOS || NYS || align=right | 1.4 km || 
|-id=174 bgcolor=#fefefe
| 101174 ||  || — || September 17, 1998 || Anderson Mesa || LONEOS || NYS || align=right | 1.8 km || 
|-id=175 bgcolor=#E9E9E9
| 101175 ||  || — || September 20, 1998 || Kitt Peak || Spacewatch || — || align=right | 3.7 km || 
|-id=176 bgcolor=#fefefe
| 101176 ||  || — || September 20, 1998 || Kitt Peak || Spacewatch || — || align=right | 1.7 km || 
|-id=177 bgcolor=#fefefe
| 101177 ||  || — || September 20, 1998 || Kitt Peak || Spacewatch || NYS || align=right | 1.7 km || 
|-id=178 bgcolor=#E9E9E9
| 101178 ||  || — || September 20, 1998 || Kitt Peak || Spacewatch || — || align=right | 3.1 km || 
|-id=179 bgcolor=#d6d6d6
| 101179 ||  || — || September 20, 1998 || Kitt Peak || Spacewatch || — || align=right | 2.5 km || 
|-id=180 bgcolor=#E9E9E9
| 101180 ||  || — || September 17, 1998 || Xinglong || SCAP || — || align=right | 3.4 km || 
|-id=181 bgcolor=#fefefe
| 101181 ||  || — || September 21, 1998 || Catalina || CSS || PHO || align=right | 2.8 km || 
|-id=182 bgcolor=#E9E9E9
| 101182 ||  || — || September 17, 1998 || Caussols || ODAS || — || align=right | 2.0 km || 
|-id=183 bgcolor=#fefefe
| 101183 ||  || — || September 19, 1998 || Caussols || ODAS || — || align=right | 1.4 km || 
|-id=184 bgcolor=#fefefe
| 101184 ||  || — || September 21, 1998 || Catalina || CSS || PHO || align=right | 6.3 km || 
|-id=185 bgcolor=#fefefe
| 101185 ||  || — || September 23, 1998 || Catalina || CSS || H || align=right | 1.4 km || 
|-id=186 bgcolor=#fefefe
| 101186 ||  || — || September 23, 1998 || Ondřejov || P. Pravec || V || align=right | 1.2 km || 
|-id=187 bgcolor=#E9E9E9
| 101187 ||  || — || September 16, 1998 || Anderson Mesa || LONEOS || — || align=right | 4.1 km || 
|-id=188 bgcolor=#E9E9E9
| 101188 ||  || — || September 17, 1998 || Anderson Mesa || LONEOS || CLO || align=right | 5.7 km || 
|-id=189 bgcolor=#E9E9E9
| 101189 ||  || — || September 20, 1998 || Kitt Peak || Spacewatch || — || align=right | 2.0 km || 
|-id=190 bgcolor=#fefefe
| 101190 ||  || — || September 17, 1998 || Anderson Mesa || LONEOS || V || align=right | 1.2 km || 
|-id=191 bgcolor=#E9E9E9
| 101191 ||  || — || September 17, 1998 || Anderson Mesa || LONEOS || EUN || align=right | 3.6 km || 
|-id=192 bgcolor=#E9E9E9
| 101192 ||  || — || September 17, 1998 || Anderson Mesa || LONEOS || — || align=right | 3.7 km || 
|-id=193 bgcolor=#fefefe
| 101193 ||  || — || September 17, 1998 || Anderson Mesa || LONEOS || — || align=right | 1.8 km || 
|-id=194 bgcolor=#fefefe
| 101194 ||  || — || September 17, 1998 || Anderson Mesa || LONEOS || — || align=right | 1.5 km || 
|-id=195 bgcolor=#fefefe
| 101195 ||  || — || September 22, 1998 || Anderson Mesa || LONEOS || FLO || align=right | 1.5 km || 
|-id=196 bgcolor=#d6d6d6
| 101196 ||  || — || September 24, 1998 || Prescott || P. G. Comba || THM || align=right | 6.2 km || 
|-id=197 bgcolor=#fefefe
| 101197 ||  || — || September 25, 1998 || Ondřejov || P. Pravec || — || align=right | 1.8 km || 
|-id=198 bgcolor=#E9E9E9
| 101198 ||  || — || September 19, 1998 || Kitt Peak || Spacewatch || — || align=right | 1.2 km || 
|-id=199 bgcolor=#E9E9E9
| 101199 ||  || — || September 21, 1998 || Kitt Peak || Spacewatch || — || align=right | 3.3 km || 
|-id=200 bgcolor=#fefefe
| 101200 ||  || — || September 21, 1998 || Kitt Peak || Spacewatch || H || align=right data-sort-value="0.91" | 910 m || 
|}

101201–101300 

|-bgcolor=#fefefe
| 101201 ||  || — || September 26, 1998 || Socorro || LINEAR || — || align=right | 1.6 km || 
|-id=202 bgcolor=#E9E9E9
| 101202 ||  || — || September 19, 1998 || Kitt Peak || Spacewatch || — || align=right | 1.8 km || 
|-id=203 bgcolor=#E9E9E9
| 101203 ||  || — || September 23, 1998 || Kitt Peak || Spacewatch || — || align=right | 1.9 km || 
|-id=204 bgcolor=#fefefe
| 101204 ||  || — || September 17, 1998 || Xinglong || SCAP || — || align=right | 3.4 km || 
|-id=205 bgcolor=#E9E9E9
| 101205 ||  || — || September 25, 1998 || Kitt Peak || Spacewatch || — || align=right | 2.7 km || 
|-id=206 bgcolor=#d6d6d6
| 101206 ||  || — || September 25, 1998 || Kitt Peak || Spacewatch || — || align=right | 3.4 km || 
|-id=207 bgcolor=#E9E9E9
| 101207 ||  || — || September 25, 1998 || Kitt Peak || Spacewatch || WIT || align=right | 2.2 km || 
|-id=208 bgcolor=#fefefe
| 101208 ||  || — || September 27, 1998 || Kitt Peak || Spacewatch || V || align=right | 1.6 km || 
|-id=209 bgcolor=#E9E9E9
| 101209 ||  || — || September 27, 1998 || Kitt Peak || Spacewatch || GEF || align=right | 2.2 km || 
|-id=210 bgcolor=#d6d6d6
| 101210 ||  || — || September 26, 1998 || Kitt Peak || Spacewatch || — || align=right | 3.8 km || 
|-id=211 bgcolor=#fefefe
| 101211 ||  || — || September 26, 1998 || Kitt Peak || Spacewatch || V || align=right | 1.3 km || 
|-id=212 bgcolor=#E9E9E9
| 101212 ||  || — || September 27, 1998 || Kitt Peak || Spacewatch || ADE || align=right | 3.5 km || 
|-id=213 bgcolor=#d6d6d6
| 101213 ||  || — || September 28, 1998 || Kitt Peak || Spacewatch || KOR || align=right | 3.0 km || 
|-id=214 bgcolor=#E9E9E9
| 101214 ||  || — || September 28, 1998 || Kitt Peak || Spacewatch || — || align=right | 2.7 km || 
|-id=215 bgcolor=#E9E9E9
| 101215 ||  || — || September 30, 1998 || Kitt Peak || Spacewatch || AGN || align=right | 2.3 km || 
|-id=216 bgcolor=#d6d6d6
| 101216 ||  || — || September 30, 1998 || Kitt Peak || Spacewatch || — || align=right | 3.1 km || 
|-id=217 bgcolor=#E9E9E9
| 101217 ||  || — || September 16, 1998 || Anderson Mesa || LONEOS || — || align=right | 1.9 km || 
|-id=218 bgcolor=#E9E9E9
| 101218 ||  || — || September 16, 1998 || Anderson Mesa || LONEOS || EUN || align=right | 2.1 km || 
|-id=219 bgcolor=#E9E9E9
| 101219 ||  || — || September 16, 1998 || Anderson Mesa || LONEOS || — || align=right | 5.1 km || 
|-id=220 bgcolor=#fefefe
| 101220 ||  || — || September 17, 1998 || Anderson Mesa || LONEOS || — || align=right | 1.9 km || 
|-id=221 bgcolor=#fefefe
| 101221 ||  || — || September 18, 1998 || Anderson Mesa || LONEOS || V || align=right | 1.3 km || 
|-id=222 bgcolor=#E9E9E9
| 101222 ||  || — || September 20, 1998 || Xinglong || SCAP || — || align=right | 1.9 km || 
|-id=223 bgcolor=#fefefe
| 101223 ||  || — || September 25, 1998 || Xinglong || SCAP || V || align=right | 1.3 km || 
|-id=224 bgcolor=#fefefe
| 101224 ||  || — || September 20, 1998 || La Silla || E. W. Elst || NYS || align=right | 4.4 km || 
|-id=225 bgcolor=#fefefe
| 101225 ||  || — || September 20, 1998 || La Silla || E. W. Elst || FLO || align=right | 2.7 km || 
|-id=226 bgcolor=#E9E9E9
| 101226 ||  || — || September 20, 1998 || La Silla || E. W. Elst || — || align=right | 2.1 km || 
|-id=227 bgcolor=#fefefe
| 101227 ||  || — || September 19, 1998 || Socorro || LINEAR || V || align=right | 1.2 km || 
|-id=228 bgcolor=#fefefe
| 101228 ||  || — || September 19, 1998 || Socorro || LINEAR || — || align=right | 1.7 km || 
|-id=229 bgcolor=#fefefe
| 101229 ||  || — || September 21, 1998 || La Silla || E. W. Elst || — || align=right | 1.8 km || 
|-id=230 bgcolor=#fefefe
| 101230 ||  || — || September 21, 1998 || La Silla || E. W. Elst || — || align=right | 1.8 km || 
|-id=231 bgcolor=#E9E9E9
| 101231 ||  || — || September 21, 1998 || La Silla || E. W. Elst || MIS || align=right | 4.0 km || 
|-id=232 bgcolor=#E9E9E9
| 101232 ||  || — || September 29, 1998 || Socorro || LINEAR || — || align=right | 2.0 km || 
|-id=233 bgcolor=#fefefe
| 101233 ||  || — || September 19, 1998 || Socorro || LINEAR || V || align=right | 1.3 km || 
|-id=234 bgcolor=#E9E9E9
| 101234 ||  || — || September 26, 1998 || Socorro || LINEAR || — || align=right | 2.9 km || 
|-id=235 bgcolor=#fefefe
| 101235 ||  || — || September 26, 1998 || Socorro || LINEAR || NYS || align=right | 2.8 km || 
|-id=236 bgcolor=#E9E9E9
| 101236 ||  || — || September 26, 1998 || Socorro || LINEAR || — || align=right | 1.7 km || 
|-id=237 bgcolor=#fefefe
| 101237 ||  || — || September 26, 1998 || Socorro || LINEAR || V || align=right | 1.2 km || 
|-id=238 bgcolor=#E9E9E9
| 101238 ||  || — || September 26, 1998 || Socorro || LINEAR || — || align=right | 2.2 km || 
|-id=239 bgcolor=#fefefe
| 101239 ||  || — || September 26, 1998 || Socorro || LINEAR || FLO || align=right | 1.3 km || 
|-id=240 bgcolor=#E9E9E9
| 101240 ||  || — || September 26, 1998 || Socorro || LINEAR || — || align=right | 1.6 km || 
|-id=241 bgcolor=#fefefe
| 101241 ||  || — || September 26, 1998 || Socorro || LINEAR || V || align=right | 1.3 km || 
|-id=242 bgcolor=#E9E9E9
| 101242 ||  || — || September 26, 1998 || Socorro || LINEAR || — || align=right | 4.1 km || 
|-id=243 bgcolor=#fefefe
| 101243 ||  || — || September 26, 1998 || Socorro || LINEAR || — || align=right | 1.4 km || 
|-id=244 bgcolor=#E9E9E9
| 101244 ||  || — || September 26, 1998 || Socorro || LINEAR || — || align=right | 1.9 km || 
|-id=245 bgcolor=#E9E9E9
| 101245 ||  || — || September 26, 1998 || Socorro || LINEAR || — || align=right | 1.9 km || 
|-id=246 bgcolor=#fefefe
| 101246 ||  || — || September 26, 1998 || Socorro || LINEAR || NYS || align=right | 3.0 km || 
|-id=247 bgcolor=#fefefe
| 101247 ||  || — || September 26, 1998 || Socorro || LINEAR || V || align=right | 1.3 km || 
|-id=248 bgcolor=#E9E9E9
| 101248 ||  || — || September 26, 1998 || Socorro || LINEAR || — || align=right | 1.6 km || 
|-id=249 bgcolor=#E9E9E9
| 101249 ||  || — || September 26, 1998 || Socorro || LINEAR || — || align=right | 1.8 km || 
|-id=250 bgcolor=#fefefe
| 101250 ||  || — || September 26, 1998 || Socorro || LINEAR || FLO || align=right | 1.5 km || 
|-id=251 bgcolor=#E9E9E9
| 101251 ||  || — || September 26, 1998 || Socorro || LINEAR || PAD || align=right | 4.9 km || 
|-id=252 bgcolor=#E9E9E9
| 101252 ||  || — || September 26, 1998 || Socorro || LINEAR || — || align=right | 1.9 km || 
|-id=253 bgcolor=#d6d6d6
| 101253 ||  || — || September 26, 1998 || Socorro || LINEAR || — || align=right | 4.6 km || 
|-id=254 bgcolor=#fefefe
| 101254 ||  || — || September 26, 1998 || Socorro || LINEAR || — || align=right | 1.8 km || 
|-id=255 bgcolor=#fefefe
| 101255 ||  || — || September 26, 1998 || Socorro || LINEAR || MAS || align=right | 1.3 km || 
|-id=256 bgcolor=#E9E9E9
| 101256 ||  || — || September 26, 1998 || Socorro || LINEAR || — || align=right | 2.8 km || 
|-id=257 bgcolor=#fefefe
| 101257 ||  || — || September 26, 1998 || Socorro || LINEAR || FLO || align=right | 1.3 km || 
|-id=258 bgcolor=#FA8072
| 101258 ||  || — || September 26, 1998 || Socorro || LINEAR || — || align=right | 2.1 km || 
|-id=259 bgcolor=#E9E9E9
| 101259 ||  || — || September 26, 1998 || Socorro || LINEAR || — || align=right | 4.5 km || 
|-id=260 bgcolor=#E9E9E9
| 101260 ||  || — || September 26, 1998 || Socorro || LINEAR || HEN || align=right | 2.3 km || 
|-id=261 bgcolor=#fefefe
| 101261 ||  || — || September 26, 1998 || Socorro || LINEAR || — || align=right | 1.4 km || 
|-id=262 bgcolor=#fefefe
| 101262 ||  || — || September 26, 1998 || Socorro || LINEAR || — || align=right | 2.1 km || 
|-id=263 bgcolor=#fefefe
| 101263 ||  || — || September 26, 1998 || Socorro || LINEAR || — || align=right | 1.4 km || 
|-id=264 bgcolor=#d6d6d6
| 101264 ||  || — || September 26, 1998 || Socorro || LINEAR || — || align=right | 3.1 km || 
|-id=265 bgcolor=#E9E9E9
| 101265 ||  || — || September 26, 1998 || Socorro || LINEAR || — || align=right | 2.1 km || 
|-id=266 bgcolor=#E9E9E9
| 101266 ||  || — || September 26, 1998 || Socorro || LINEAR || — || align=right | 1.7 km || 
|-id=267 bgcolor=#fefefe
| 101267 ||  || — || September 26, 1998 || Socorro || LINEAR || — || align=right | 1.5 km || 
|-id=268 bgcolor=#fefefe
| 101268 ||  || — || September 26, 1998 || Socorro || LINEAR || — || align=right | 1.5 km || 
|-id=269 bgcolor=#E9E9E9
| 101269 ||  || — || September 26, 1998 || Socorro || LINEAR || — || align=right | 3.0 km || 
|-id=270 bgcolor=#fefefe
| 101270 ||  || — || September 26, 1998 || Socorro || LINEAR || — || align=right | 1.7 km || 
|-id=271 bgcolor=#fefefe
| 101271 ||  || — || September 26, 1998 || Socorro || LINEAR || NYS || align=right | 1.5 km || 
|-id=272 bgcolor=#E9E9E9
| 101272 ||  || — || September 26, 1998 || Socorro || LINEAR || — || align=right | 3.0 km || 
|-id=273 bgcolor=#E9E9E9
| 101273 ||  || — || September 26, 1998 || Socorro || LINEAR || — || align=right | 3.5 km || 
|-id=274 bgcolor=#fefefe
| 101274 ||  || — || September 26, 1998 || Socorro || LINEAR || NYS || align=right | 1.5 km || 
|-id=275 bgcolor=#E9E9E9
| 101275 ||  || — || September 26, 1998 || Socorro || LINEAR || — || align=right | 5.4 km || 
|-id=276 bgcolor=#E9E9E9
| 101276 ||  || — || September 26, 1998 || Socorro || LINEAR || — || align=right | 2.7 km || 
|-id=277 bgcolor=#fefefe
| 101277 ||  || — || September 26, 1998 || Socorro || LINEAR || — || align=right | 4.0 km || 
|-id=278 bgcolor=#E9E9E9
| 101278 ||  || — || September 26, 1998 || Socorro || LINEAR || — || align=right | 4.8 km || 
|-id=279 bgcolor=#fefefe
| 101279 ||  || — || September 26, 1998 || Socorro || LINEAR || ERI || align=right | 3.9 km || 
|-id=280 bgcolor=#fefefe
| 101280 ||  || — || September 26, 1998 || Socorro || LINEAR || FLO || align=right | 1.4 km || 
|-id=281 bgcolor=#fefefe
| 101281 ||  || — || September 26, 1998 || Socorro || LINEAR || NYS || align=right | 3.4 km || 
|-id=282 bgcolor=#fefefe
| 101282 ||  || — || September 26, 1998 || Socorro || LINEAR || NYS || align=right | 1.6 km || 
|-id=283 bgcolor=#E9E9E9
| 101283 ||  || — || September 26, 1998 || Socorro || LINEAR || PAL || align=right | 6.1 km || 
|-id=284 bgcolor=#d6d6d6
| 101284 ||  || — || September 26, 1998 || Socorro || LINEAR || — || align=right | 4.6 km || 
|-id=285 bgcolor=#E9E9E9
| 101285 ||  || — || September 26, 1998 || Socorro || LINEAR || — || align=right | 3.0 km || 
|-id=286 bgcolor=#E9E9E9
| 101286 ||  || — || September 26, 1998 || Socorro || LINEAR || — || align=right | 3.3 km || 
|-id=287 bgcolor=#E9E9E9
| 101287 ||  || — || September 26, 1998 || Socorro || LINEAR || — || align=right | 1.7 km || 
|-id=288 bgcolor=#E9E9E9
| 101288 ||  || — || September 26, 1998 || Socorro || LINEAR || — || align=right | 2.9 km || 
|-id=289 bgcolor=#fefefe
| 101289 ||  || — || September 26, 1998 || Socorro || LINEAR || — || align=right | 1.2 km || 
|-id=290 bgcolor=#E9E9E9
| 101290 ||  || — || September 26, 1998 || Socorro || LINEAR || — || align=right | 3.3 km || 
|-id=291 bgcolor=#fefefe
| 101291 ||  || — || September 26, 1998 || Socorro || LINEAR || — || align=right | 1.8 km || 
|-id=292 bgcolor=#fefefe
| 101292 ||  || — || September 26, 1998 || Socorro || LINEAR || — || align=right | 1.5 km || 
|-id=293 bgcolor=#E9E9E9
| 101293 ||  || — || September 26, 1998 || Socorro || LINEAR || MAR || align=right | 2.2 km || 
|-id=294 bgcolor=#E9E9E9
| 101294 ||  || — || September 26, 1998 || Socorro || LINEAR || DOR || align=right | 5.0 km || 
|-id=295 bgcolor=#fefefe
| 101295 ||  || — || September 26, 1998 || Socorro || LINEAR || V || align=right | 1.7 km || 
|-id=296 bgcolor=#E9E9E9
| 101296 ||  || — || September 26, 1998 || Socorro || LINEAR || — || align=right | 1.9 km || 
|-id=297 bgcolor=#fefefe
| 101297 ||  || — || September 26, 1998 || Socorro || LINEAR || NYS || align=right | 1.00 km || 
|-id=298 bgcolor=#fefefe
| 101298 ||  || — || September 26, 1998 || Socorro || LINEAR || NYS || align=right | 1.4 km || 
|-id=299 bgcolor=#fefefe
| 101299 ||  || — || September 26, 1998 || Socorro || LINEAR || NYS || align=right | 1.6 km || 
|-id=300 bgcolor=#fefefe
| 101300 ||  || — || September 26, 1998 || Socorro || LINEAR || — || align=right | 1.7 km || 
|}

101301–101400 

|-bgcolor=#E9E9E9
| 101301 ||  || — || September 26, 1998 || Socorro || LINEAR || MAR || align=right | 2.4 km || 
|-id=302 bgcolor=#E9E9E9
| 101302 ||  || — || September 26, 1998 || Socorro || LINEAR || — || align=right | 3.8 km || 
|-id=303 bgcolor=#fefefe
| 101303 ||  || — || September 26, 1998 || Socorro || LINEAR || NYS || align=right | 3.2 km || 
|-id=304 bgcolor=#fefefe
| 101304 ||  || — || September 26, 1998 || Socorro || LINEAR || NYS || align=right | 1.4 km || 
|-id=305 bgcolor=#fefefe
| 101305 ||  || — || September 26, 1998 || Socorro || LINEAR || NYS || align=right | 1.4 km || 
|-id=306 bgcolor=#fefefe
| 101306 ||  || — || September 26, 1998 || Socorro || LINEAR || ERI || align=right | 3.6 km || 
|-id=307 bgcolor=#E9E9E9
| 101307 ||  || — || September 26, 1998 || Socorro || LINEAR || — || align=right | 3.5 km || 
|-id=308 bgcolor=#E9E9E9
| 101308 ||  || — || September 26, 1998 || Socorro || LINEAR || GAL || align=right | 3.2 km || 
|-id=309 bgcolor=#fefefe
| 101309 ||  || — || September 26, 1998 || Socorro || LINEAR || NYS || align=right | 1.3 km || 
|-id=310 bgcolor=#fefefe
| 101310 ||  || — || September 26, 1998 || Socorro || LINEAR || NYS || align=right | 1.0 km || 
|-id=311 bgcolor=#fefefe
| 101311 ||  || — || September 26, 1998 || Socorro || LINEAR || — || align=right | 1.5 km || 
|-id=312 bgcolor=#E9E9E9
| 101312 ||  || — || September 26, 1998 || Socorro || LINEAR || — || align=right | 3.8 km || 
|-id=313 bgcolor=#E9E9E9
| 101313 ||  || — || September 26, 1998 || Socorro || LINEAR || MRX || align=right | 2.5 km || 
|-id=314 bgcolor=#fefefe
| 101314 ||  || — || September 26, 1998 || Socorro || LINEAR || — || align=right | 1.6 km || 
|-id=315 bgcolor=#E9E9E9
| 101315 ||  || — || September 18, 1998 || La Silla || E. W. Elst || — || align=right | 3.6 km || 
|-id=316 bgcolor=#fefefe
| 101316 ||  || — || September 20, 1998 || La Silla || E. W. Elst || NYS || align=right | 1.3 km || 
|-id=317 bgcolor=#fefefe
| 101317 ||  || — || September 26, 1998 || Socorro || LINEAR || NYS || align=right | 1.4 km || 
|-id=318 bgcolor=#E9E9E9
| 101318 ||  || — || September 26, 1998 || Socorro || LINEAR || — || align=right | 2.0 km || 
|-id=319 bgcolor=#fefefe
| 101319 ||  || — || September 26, 1998 || Socorro || LINEAR || — || align=right | 2.1 km || 
|-id=320 bgcolor=#fefefe
| 101320 ||  || — || September 26, 1998 || Socorro || LINEAR || — || align=right | 2.0 km || 
|-id=321 bgcolor=#E9E9E9
| 101321 ||  || — || September 26, 1998 || Socorro || LINEAR || — || align=right | 3.3 km || 
|-id=322 bgcolor=#E9E9E9
| 101322 ||  || — || September 26, 1998 || Socorro || LINEAR || — || align=right | 4.1 km || 
|-id=323 bgcolor=#fefefe
| 101323 ||  || — || September 26, 1998 || Socorro || LINEAR || FLO || align=right | 1.3 km || 
|-id=324 bgcolor=#fefefe
| 101324 ||  || — || September 26, 1998 || Socorro || LINEAR || — || align=right | 1.4 km || 
|-id=325 bgcolor=#d6d6d6
| 101325 ||  || — || September 26, 1998 || Socorro || LINEAR || — || align=right | 4.3 km || 
|-id=326 bgcolor=#fefefe
| 101326 ||  || — || September 26, 1998 || Socorro || LINEAR || — || align=right | 1.5 km || 
|-id=327 bgcolor=#fefefe
| 101327 ||  || — || September 26, 1998 || Socorro || LINEAR || NYS || align=right | 1.1 km || 
|-id=328 bgcolor=#FA8072
| 101328 ||  || — || September 26, 1998 || Socorro || LINEAR || — || align=right | 1.4 km || 
|-id=329 bgcolor=#d6d6d6
| 101329 ||  || — || September 26, 1998 || Socorro || LINEAR || — || align=right | 5.7 km || 
|-id=330 bgcolor=#E9E9E9
| 101330 ||  || — || September 18, 1998 || La Silla || E. W. Elst || EUN || align=right | 2.9 km || 
|-id=331 bgcolor=#fefefe
| 101331 Sjöström ||  ||  || September 18, 1998 || La Silla || E. W. Elst || H || align=right | 1.4 km || 
|-id=332 bgcolor=#fefefe
| 101332 ||  || — || September 19, 1998 || Anderson Mesa || LONEOS || — || align=right | 2.2 km || 
|-id=333 bgcolor=#E9E9E9
| 101333 ||  || — || September 16, 1998 || Anderson Mesa || LONEOS || — || align=right | 2.8 km || 
|-id=334 bgcolor=#fefefe
| 101334 ||  || — || September 22, 1998 || Anderson Mesa || LONEOS || — || align=right | 1.3 km || 
|-id=335 bgcolor=#fefefe
| 101335 ||  || — || September 18, 1998 || Caussols || ODAS || NYS || align=right | 1.3 km || 
|-id=336 bgcolor=#E9E9E9
| 101336 ||  || — || October 12, 1998 || Kitt Peak || Spacewatch || — || align=right | 4.2 km || 
|-id=337 bgcolor=#d6d6d6
| 101337 ||  || — || October 12, 1998 || Caussols || ODAS || EOS || align=right | 3.2 km || 
|-id=338 bgcolor=#E9E9E9
| 101338 ||  || — || October 13, 1998 || Caussols || ODAS || — || align=right | 4.0 km || 
|-id=339 bgcolor=#E9E9E9
| 101339 ||  || — || October 13, 1998 || Caussols || ODAS || — || align=right | 2.3 km || 
|-id=340 bgcolor=#d6d6d6
| 101340 ||  || — || October 13, 1998 || Kitt Peak || Spacewatch || KOR || align=right | 2.6 km || 
|-id=341 bgcolor=#E9E9E9
| 101341 ||  || — || October 12, 1998 || Caussols || ODAS || — || align=right | 2.1 km || 
|-id=342 bgcolor=#d6d6d6
| 101342 ||  || — || October 12, 1998 || Kitt Peak || Spacewatch || — || align=right | 3.9 km || 
|-id=343 bgcolor=#fefefe
| 101343 ||  || — || October 12, 1998 || Kitt Peak || Spacewatch || EUT || align=right | 1.9 km || 
|-id=344 bgcolor=#E9E9E9
| 101344 ||  || — || October 13, 1998 || Kitt Peak || Spacewatch || — || align=right | 4.3 km || 
|-id=345 bgcolor=#fefefe
| 101345 ||  || — || October 13, 1998 || Kitt Peak || Spacewatch || — || align=right | 1.9 km || 
|-id=346 bgcolor=#d6d6d6
| 101346 ||  || — || October 15, 1998 || Caussols || ODAS || — || align=right | 8.5 km || 
|-id=347 bgcolor=#fefefe
| 101347 ||  || — || October 15, 1998 || Caussols || ODAS || V || align=right | 1.4 km || 
|-id=348 bgcolor=#fefefe
| 101348 ||  || — || October 14, 1998 || Caussols || ODAS || — || align=right | 2.3 km || 
|-id=349 bgcolor=#fefefe
| 101349 ||  || — || October 14, 1998 || Xinglong || SCAP || NYS || align=right | 1.2 km || 
|-id=350 bgcolor=#E9E9E9
| 101350 ||  || — || October 13, 1998 || Kitt Peak || Spacewatch || — || align=right | 4.3 km || 
|-id=351 bgcolor=#d6d6d6
| 101351 ||  || — || October 15, 1998 || Kitt Peak || Spacewatch || THM || align=right | 4.1 km || 
|-id=352 bgcolor=#fefefe
| 101352 ||  || — || October 14, 1998 || Anderson Mesa || LONEOS || — || align=right | 1.5 km || 
|-id=353 bgcolor=#fefefe
| 101353 ||  || — || October 14, 1998 || Anderson Mesa || LONEOS || NYS || align=right | 1.4 km || 
|-id=354 bgcolor=#E9E9E9
| 101354 ||  || — || October 14, 1998 || Anderson Mesa || LONEOS || — || align=right | 2.7 km || 
|-id=355 bgcolor=#fefefe
| 101355 ||  || — || October 15, 1998 || Caussols || ODAS || NYS || align=right | 1.3 km || 
|-id=356 bgcolor=#d6d6d6
| 101356 ||  || — || October 15, 1998 || Xinglong || SCAP || KOR || align=right | 2.2 km || 
|-id=357 bgcolor=#E9E9E9
| 101357 ||  || — || October 14, 1998 || Anderson Mesa || LONEOS || EUN || align=right | 1.7 km || 
|-id=358 bgcolor=#E9E9E9
| 101358 ||  || — || October 10, 1998 || Anderson Mesa || LONEOS || — || align=right | 1.9 km || 
|-id=359 bgcolor=#E9E9E9
| 101359 ||  || — || October 14, 1998 || Anderson Mesa || LONEOS || EUN || align=right | 2.3 km || 
|-id=360 bgcolor=#d6d6d6
| 101360 || 1998 UH || — || October 17, 1998 || Catalina || CSS || Tj (2.97) || align=right | 9.0 km || 
|-id=361 bgcolor=#fefefe
| 101361 || 1998 UJ || — || October 17, 1998 || Catalina || CSS || PHO || align=right | 2.2 km || 
|-id=362 bgcolor=#fefefe
| 101362 || 1998 UP || — || October 17, 1998 || Prescott || P. G. Comba || FLO || align=right | 1.2 km || 
|-id=363 bgcolor=#FA8072
| 101363 || 1998 UQ || — || October 16, 1998 || Socorro || LINEAR || — || align=right | 2.0 km || 
|-id=364 bgcolor=#fefefe
| 101364 || 1998 US || — || October 18, 1998 || Prescott || P. G. Comba || — || align=right | 3.3 km || 
|-id=365 bgcolor=#fefefe
| 101365 || 1998 UT || — || October 16, 1998 || Catalina || CSS || H || align=right | 1.3 km || 
|-id=366 bgcolor=#d6d6d6
| 101366 || 1998 UY || — || October 17, 1998 || Kitt Peak || Spacewatch || — || align=right | 5.3 km || 
|-id=367 bgcolor=#d6d6d6
| 101367 ||  || — || October 16, 1998 || Ondřejov || P. Pravec || — || align=right | 4.8 km || 
|-id=368 bgcolor=#E9E9E9
| 101368 ||  || — || October 20, 1998 || Caussols || ODAS || — || align=right | 1.8 km || 
|-id=369 bgcolor=#E9E9E9
| 101369 ||  || — || October 20, 1998 || Caussols || ODAS || — || align=right | 3.7 km || 
|-id=370 bgcolor=#fefefe
| 101370 ||  || — || October 20, 1998 || Caussols || ODAS || ERI || align=right | 3.1 km || 
|-id=371 bgcolor=#fefefe
| 101371 ||  || — || October 22, 1998 || Caussols || ODAS || NYS || align=right | 1.4 km || 
|-id=372 bgcolor=#E9E9E9
| 101372 ||  || — || October 22, 1998 || Caussols || ODAS || — || align=right | 3.4 km || 
|-id=373 bgcolor=#fefefe
| 101373 ||  || — || October 17, 1998 || Xinglong || SCAP || NYS || align=right | 1.1 km || 
|-id=374 bgcolor=#E9E9E9
| 101374 ||  || — || October 16, 1998 || Kitt Peak || Spacewatch || HEN || align=right | 1.9 km || 
|-id=375 bgcolor=#E9E9E9
| 101375 ||  || — || October 16, 1998 || Kitt Peak || Spacewatch || — || align=right | 2.5 km || 
|-id=376 bgcolor=#E9E9E9
| 101376 ||  || — || October 17, 1998 || Kitt Peak || Spacewatch || GEF || align=right | 2.0 km || 
|-id=377 bgcolor=#E9E9E9
| 101377 ||  || — || October 17, 1998 || Kitt Peak || Spacewatch || — || align=right | 2.4 km || 
|-id=378 bgcolor=#E9E9E9
| 101378 ||  || — || October 18, 1998 || Kitt Peak || Spacewatch || — || align=right | 2.1 km || 
|-id=379 bgcolor=#fefefe
| 101379 ||  || — || October 23, 1998 || Caussols || ODAS || — || align=right | 1.4 km || 
|-id=380 bgcolor=#fefefe
| 101380 ||  || — || October 18, 1998 || Xinglong || SCAP || NYS || align=right | 1.4 km || 
|-id=381 bgcolor=#fefefe
| 101381 ||  || — || October 28, 1998 || Socorro || LINEAR || — || align=right | 2.3 km || 
|-id=382 bgcolor=#fefefe
| 101382 ||  || — || October 28, 1998 || Socorro || LINEAR || V || align=right | 1.5 km || 
|-id=383 bgcolor=#fefefe
| 101383 Karloff ||  ||  || October 30, 1998 || Goodricke-Pigott || R. A. Tucker || — || align=right | 2.0 km || 
|-id=384 bgcolor=#E9E9E9
| 101384 ||  || — || October 17, 1998 || Anderson Mesa || LONEOS || — || align=right | 1.9 km || 
|-id=385 bgcolor=#fefefe
| 101385 ||  || — || October 17, 1998 || Anderson Mesa || LONEOS || — || align=right | 1.7 km || 
|-id=386 bgcolor=#E9E9E9
| 101386 ||  || — || October 18, 1998 || La Silla || E. W. Elst || — || align=right | 2.1 km || 
|-id=387 bgcolor=#E9E9E9
| 101387 ||  || — || October 29, 1998 || Socorro || LINEAR || — || align=right | 4.3 km || 
|-id=388 bgcolor=#fefefe
| 101388 ||  || — || October 29, 1998 || Catalina || CSS || PHO || align=right | 2.4 km || 
|-id=389 bgcolor=#E9E9E9
| 101389 ||  || — || October 28, 1998 || Socorro || LINEAR || — || align=right | 2.1 km || 
|-id=390 bgcolor=#fefefe
| 101390 ||  || — || October 28, 1998 || Socorro || LINEAR || V || align=right | 2.0 km || 
|-id=391 bgcolor=#fefefe
| 101391 ||  || — || October 28, 1998 || Socorro || LINEAR || — || align=right | 3.2 km || 
|-id=392 bgcolor=#fefefe
| 101392 ||  || — || October 28, 1998 || Socorro || LINEAR || — || align=right | 1.6 km || 
|-id=393 bgcolor=#fefefe
| 101393 ||  || — || October 28, 1998 || Socorro || LINEAR || — || align=right | 1.5 km || 
|-id=394 bgcolor=#fefefe
| 101394 ||  || — || October 28, 1998 || Socorro || LINEAR || NYS || align=right | 1.5 km || 
|-id=395 bgcolor=#fefefe
| 101395 ||  || — || October 28, 1998 || Socorro || LINEAR || — || align=right | 1.8 km || 
|-id=396 bgcolor=#fefefe
| 101396 ||  || — || October 28, 1998 || Socorro || LINEAR || EUT || align=right | 1.0 km || 
|-id=397 bgcolor=#fefefe
| 101397 ||  || — || October 28, 1998 || Socorro || LINEAR || NYS || align=right | 1.6 km || 
|-id=398 bgcolor=#E9E9E9
| 101398 ||  || — || October 28, 1998 || Socorro || LINEAR || — || align=right | 2.3 km || 
|-id=399 bgcolor=#d6d6d6
| 101399 ||  || — || October 28, 1998 || Socorro || LINEAR || — || align=right | 6.5 km || 
|-id=400 bgcolor=#E9E9E9
| 101400 ||  || — || October 28, 1998 || Socorro || LINEAR || — || align=right | 1.6 km || 
|}

101401–101500 

|-bgcolor=#fefefe
| 101401 || 1998 VD || — || November 7, 1998 || Gekko || T. Kagawa || NYS || align=right | 1.7 km || 
|-id=402 bgcolor=#FA8072
| 101402 ||  || — || November 10, 1998 || Socorro || LINEAR || — || align=right | 2.0 km || 
|-id=403 bgcolor=#E9E9E9
| 101403 ||  || — || November 10, 1998 || Caussols || ODAS || — || align=right | 3.9 km || 
|-id=404 bgcolor=#d6d6d6
| 101404 ||  || — || November 10, 1998 || Caussols || ODAS || — || align=right | 5.3 km || 
|-id=405 bgcolor=#C2FFFF
| 101405 ||  || — || November 10, 1998 || Caussols || ODAS || L4ERY || align=right | 13 km || 
|-id=406 bgcolor=#d6d6d6
| 101406 ||  || — || November 10, 1998 || Caussols || ODAS || — || align=right | 3.7 km || 
|-id=407 bgcolor=#E9E9E9
| 101407 ||  || — || November 10, 1998 || Caussols || ODAS || HEN || align=right | 1.8 km || 
|-id=408 bgcolor=#fefefe
| 101408 ||  || — || November 11, 1998 || Gekko || T. Kagawa || NYS || align=right | 1.4 km || 
|-id=409 bgcolor=#fefefe
| 101409 ||  || — || November 11, 1998 || Nachi-Katsuura || Y. Shimizu, T. Urata || — || align=right | 2.1 km || 
|-id=410 bgcolor=#fefefe
| 101410 ||  || — || November 12, 1998 || Ondřejov || P. Pravec || NYS || align=right | 1.4 km || 
|-id=411 bgcolor=#fefefe
| 101411 ||  || — || November 10, 1998 || Socorro || LINEAR || — || align=right | 1.7 km || 
|-id=412 bgcolor=#E9E9E9
| 101412 ||  || — || November 10, 1998 || Socorro || LINEAR || — || align=right | 7.0 km || 
|-id=413 bgcolor=#fefefe
| 101413 ||  || — || November 10, 1998 || Socorro || LINEAR || ERI || align=right | 3.2 km || 
|-id=414 bgcolor=#fefefe
| 101414 ||  || — || November 10, 1998 || Socorro || LINEAR || — || align=right | 1.3 km || 
|-id=415 bgcolor=#E9E9E9
| 101415 ||  || — || November 10, 1998 || Socorro || LINEAR || — || align=right | 1.3 km || 
|-id=416 bgcolor=#E9E9E9
| 101416 ||  || — || November 10, 1998 || Socorro || LINEAR || — || align=right | 3.5 km || 
|-id=417 bgcolor=#fefefe
| 101417 ||  || — || November 10, 1998 || Socorro || LINEAR || — || align=right | 1.5 km || 
|-id=418 bgcolor=#fefefe
| 101418 ||  || — || November 10, 1998 || Socorro || LINEAR || — || align=right | 1.4 km || 
|-id=419 bgcolor=#E9E9E9
| 101419 ||  || — || November 10, 1998 || Socorro || LINEAR || — || align=right | 1.7 km || 
|-id=420 bgcolor=#fefefe
| 101420 ||  || — || November 10, 1998 || Socorro || LINEAR || — || align=right | 1.6 km || 
|-id=421 bgcolor=#d6d6d6
| 101421 ||  || — || November 10, 1998 || Socorro || LINEAR || TIR || align=right | 3.9 km || 
|-id=422 bgcolor=#fefefe
| 101422 ||  || — || November 10, 1998 || Socorro || LINEAR || FLO || align=right | 1.5 km || 
|-id=423 bgcolor=#E9E9E9
| 101423 ||  || — || November 10, 1998 || Socorro || LINEAR || — || align=right | 1.9 km || 
|-id=424 bgcolor=#E9E9E9
| 101424 ||  || — || November 10, 1998 || Socorro || LINEAR || — || align=right | 4.1 km || 
|-id=425 bgcolor=#E9E9E9
| 101425 ||  || — || November 10, 1998 || Socorro || LINEAR || — || align=right | 2.5 km || 
|-id=426 bgcolor=#E9E9E9
| 101426 ||  || — || November 10, 1998 || Socorro || LINEAR || — || align=right | 2.6 km || 
|-id=427 bgcolor=#fefefe
| 101427 ||  || — || November 10, 1998 || Socorro || LINEAR || — || align=right | 2.0 km || 
|-id=428 bgcolor=#E9E9E9
| 101428 ||  || — || November 10, 1998 || Socorro || LINEAR || — || align=right | 2.7 km || 
|-id=429 bgcolor=#FA8072
| 101429 ||  || — || November 13, 1998 || Socorro || LINEAR || — || align=right | 1.0 km || 
|-id=430 bgcolor=#FA8072
| 101430 ||  || — || November 14, 1998 || Socorro || LINEAR || — || align=right | 2.5 km || 
|-id=431 bgcolor=#E9E9E9
| 101431 ||  || — || November 11, 1998 || Chichibu || N. Satō || — || align=right | 2.4 km || 
|-id=432 bgcolor=#E9E9E9
| 101432 Adamwest ||  ||  || November 14, 1998 || Goodricke-Pigott || R. A. Tucker || — || align=right | 2.5 km || 
|-id=433 bgcolor=#E9E9E9
| 101433 ||  || — || November 11, 1998 || Socorro || LINEAR || HNS || align=right | 2.5 km || 
|-id=434 bgcolor=#E9E9E9
| 101434 ||  || — || November 10, 1998 || Caussols || ODAS || — || align=right | 4.5 km || 
|-id=435 bgcolor=#fefefe
| 101435 ||  || — || November 14, 1998 || Socorro || LINEAR || NYS || align=right | 1.4 km || 
|-id=436 bgcolor=#fefefe
| 101436 ||  || — || November 14, 1998 || Socorro || LINEAR || NYS || align=right | 1.4 km || 
|-id=437 bgcolor=#E9E9E9
| 101437 ||  || — || November 10, 1998 || Socorro || LINEAR || — || align=right | 2.9 km || 
|-id=438 bgcolor=#fefefe
| 101438 ||  || — || November 11, 1998 || Socorro || LINEAR || ERI || align=right | 4.2 km || 
|-id=439 bgcolor=#fefefe
| 101439 ||  || — || November 11, 1998 || Socorro || LINEAR || V || align=right | 1.3 km || 
|-id=440 bgcolor=#fefefe
| 101440 ||  || — || November 14, 1998 || Kitt Peak || Spacewatch || NYS || align=right | 1.1 km || 
|-id=441 bgcolor=#fefefe
| 101441 ||  || — || November 15, 1998 || Kitt Peak || Spacewatch || NYS || align=right | 1.1 km || 
|-id=442 bgcolor=#E9E9E9
| 101442 ||  || — || November 15, 1998 || Kitt Peak || Spacewatch || MRX || align=right | 1.6 km || 
|-id=443 bgcolor=#E9E9E9
| 101443 ||  || — || November 15, 1998 || Kitt Peak || Spacewatch || EUN || align=right | 2.6 km || 
|-id=444 bgcolor=#fefefe
| 101444 ||  || — || November 15, 1998 || Kitt Peak || Spacewatch || — || align=right | 2.1 km || 
|-id=445 bgcolor=#E9E9E9
| 101445 ||  || — || November 14, 1998 || Kitt Peak || Spacewatch || — || align=right | 3.3 km || 
|-id=446 bgcolor=#E9E9E9
| 101446 ||  || — || November 15, 1998 || Kitt Peak || Spacewatch || — || align=right | 4.0 km || 
|-id=447 bgcolor=#fefefe
| 101447 ||  || — || November 11, 1998 || Socorro || LINEAR || — || align=right | 2.6 km || 
|-id=448 bgcolor=#fefefe
| 101448 ||  || — || November 14, 1998 || Socorro || LINEAR || FLO || align=right | 1.3 km || 
|-id=449 bgcolor=#fefefe
| 101449 ||  || — || November 15, 1998 || Haleakala || NEAT || — || align=right | 1.9 km || 
|-id=450 bgcolor=#fefefe
| 101450 ||  || — || November 15, 1998 || Anderson Mesa || LONEOS || NYS || align=right | 3.3 km || 
|-id=451 bgcolor=#fefefe
| 101451 ||  || — || November 14, 1998 || Socorro || LINEAR || — || align=right | 4.8 km || 
|-id=452 bgcolor=#fefefe
| 101452 ||  || — || November 18, 1998 || Oizumi || T. Kobayashi || — || align=right | 1.7 km || 
|-id=453 bgcolor=#E9E9E9
| 101453 ||  || — || November 19, 1998 || Caussols || ODAS || — || align=right | 3.7 km || 
|-id=454 bgcolor=#fefefe
| 101454 ||  || — || November 17, 1998 || Caussols || ODAS || NYS || align=right | 1.9 km || 
|-id=455 bgcolor=#fefefe
| 101455 ||  || — || November 17, 1998 || Catalina || CSS || H || align=right | 1.3 km || 
|-id=456 bgcolor=#d6d6d6
| 101456 ||  || — || November 19, 1998 || Catalina || CSS || — || align=right | 7.5 km || 
|-id=457 bgcolor=#fefefe
| 101457 ||  || — || November 21, 1998 || Socorro || LINEAR || — || align=right | 2.7 km || 
|-id=458 bgcolor=#E9E9E9
| 101458 ||  || — || November 22, 1998 || Les Tardieux Obs. || M. Boeuf || — || align=right | 4.0 km || 
|-id=459 bgcolor=#fefefe
| 101459 ||  || — || November 19, 1998 || Uenohara || N. Kawasato || NYS || align=right | 1.2 km || 
|-id=460 bgcolor=#fefefe
| 101460 ||  || — || November 23, 1998 || Gekko || T. Kagawa || V || align=right | 1.3 km || 
|-id=461 bgcolor=#fefefe
| 101461 Dunedin ||  ||  || November 25, 1998 || Cocoa || I. P. Griffin || — || align=right | 1.7 km || 
|-id=462 bgcolor=#fefefe
| 101462 Tahupotiki ||  ||  || November 25, 1998 || Cocoa || I. P. Griffin || — || align=right | 1.7 km || 
|-id=463 bgcolor=#fefefe
| 101463 ||  || — || November 21, 1998 || Socorro || LINEAR || — || align=right | 1.9 km || 
|-id=464 bgcolor=#E9E9E9
| 101464 ||  || — || November 21, 1998 || Socorro || LINEAR || — || align=right | 4.5 km || 
|-id=465 bgcolor=#FA8072
| 101465 ||  || — || November 21, 1998 || Socorro || LINEAR || — || align=right | 1.5 km || 
|-id=466 bgcolor=#C2FFFF
| 101466 ||  || — || November 21, 1998 || Socorro || LINEAR || L4 || align=right | 19 km || 
|-id=467 bgcolor=#fefefe
| 101467 ||  || — || November 21, 1998 || Socorro || LINEAR || V || align=right | 1.8 km || 
|-id=468 bgcolor=#E9E9E9
| 101468 ||  || — || November 21, 1998 || Socorro || LINEAR || — || align=right | 1.9 km || 
|-id=469 bgcolor=#E9E9E9
| 101469 ||  || — || November 21, 1998 || Socorro || LINEAR || — || align=right | 3.5 km || 
|-id=470 bgcolor=#E9E9E9
| 101470 ||  || — || November 21, 1998 || Socorro || LINEAR || — || align=right | 3.3 km || 
|-id=471 bgcolor=#E9E9E9
| 101471 ||  || — || November 21, 1998 || Socorro || LINEAR || — || align=right | 2.9 km || 
|-id=472 bgcolor=#fefefe
| 101472 ||  || — || November 21, 1998 || Socorro || LINEAR || ERI || align=right | 3.6 km || 
|-id=473 bgcolor=#E9E9E9
| 101473 ||  || — || November 18, 1998 || Socorro || LINEAR || — || align=right | 3.1 km || 
|-id=474 bgcolor=#d6d6d6
| 101474 ||  || — || November 18, 1998 || Socorro || LINEAR || CHA || align=right | 4.1 km || 
|-id=475 bgcolor=#fefefe
| 101475 ||  || — || November 18, 1998 || Socorro || LINEAR || NYS || align=right | 1.5 km || 
|-id=476 bgcolor=#fefefe
| 101476 ||  || — || November 18, 1998 || Socorro || LINEAR || — || align=right | 1.9 km || 
|-id=477 bgcolor=#d6d6d6
| 101477 ||  || — || November 16, 1998 || Kitt Peak || Spacewatch || — || align=right | 6.6 km || 
|-id=478 bgcolor=#E9E9E9
| 101478 ||  || — || November 18, 1998 || Kitt Peak || Spacewatch || — || align=right | 2.5 km || 
|-id=479 bgcolor=#E9E9E9
| 101479 ||  || — || November 23, 1998 || Kitt Peak || Spacewatch || — || align=right | 2.1 km || 
|-id=480 bgcolor=#E9E9E9
| 101480 ||  || — || November 20, 1998 || Anderson Mesa || LONEOS || — || align=right | 2.4 km || 
|-id=481 bgcolor=#fefefe
| 101481 ||  || — || November 23, 1998 || Anderson Mesa || LONEOS || NYS || align=right | 1.7 km || 
|-id=482 bgcolor=#E9E9E9
| 101482 ||  || — || November 23, 1998 || Anderson Mesa || LONEOS || — || align=right | 5.4 km || 
|-id=483 bgcolor=#E9E9E9
| 101483 ||  || — || November 17, 1998 || Kitt Peak || Spacewatch || — || align=right | 5.7 km || 
|-id=484 bgcolor=#d6d6d6
| 101484 ||  || — || November 18, 1998 || Kitt Peak || Spacewatch || — || align=right | 3.5 km || 
|-id=485 bgcolor=#E9E9E9
| 101485 ||  || — || November 19, 1998 || Kitt Peak || Spacewatch || — || align=right | 2.1 km || 
|-id=486 bgcolor=#d6d6d6
| 101486 ||  || — || November 21, 1998 || Kitt Peak || Spacewatch || — || align=right | 6.5 km || 
|-id=487 bgcolor=#FA8072
| 101487 ||  || — || November 22, 1998 || Kitt Peak || Spacewatch || — || align=right | 1.8 km || 
|-id=488 bgcolor=#d6d6d6
| 101488 ||  || — || November 19, 1998 || Caussols || ODAS || — || align=right | 4.7 km || 
|-id=489 bgcolor=#E9E9E9
| 101489 ||  || — || November 20, 1998 || Anderson Mesa || LONEOS || — || align=right | 3.2 km || 
|-id=490 bgcolor=#fefefe
| 101490 ||  || — || November 20, 1998 || Anderson Mesa || LONEOS || NYS || align=right | 1.6 km || 
|-id=491 bgcolor=#E9E9E9
| 101491 Grahamcrombie || 1998 XA ||  || December 1, 1998 || Cocoa || I. P. Griffin || MIT || align=right | 3.3 km || 
|-id=492 bgcolor=#C2FFFF
| 101492 ||  || — || December 7, 1998 || Caussols || ODAS || L4 || align=right | 21 km || 
|-id=493 bgcolor=#fefefe
| 101493 ||  || — || December 7, 1998 || San Marcello || M. Tombelli, A. Boattini || — || align=right | 1.6 km || 
|-id=494 bgcolor=#E9E9E9
| 101494 ||  || — || December 8, 1998 || Woomera || F. B. Zoltowski || — || align=right | 2.1 km || 
|-id=495 bgcolor=#d6d6d6
| 101495 ||  || — || December 10, 1998 || Ondřejov || L. Kotková || — || align=right | 3.5 km || 
|-id=496 bgcolor=#FA8072
| 101496 ||  || — || December 9, 1998 || Nachi-Katsuura || Y. Shimizu, T. Urata || — || align=right | 2.2 km || 
|-id=497 bgcolor=#d6d6d6
| 101497 ||  || — || December 8, 1998 || Kitt Peak || Spacewatch || — || align=right | 3.3 km || 
|-id=498 bgcolor=#d6d6d6
| 101498 ||  || — || December 8, 1998 || Kitt Peak || Spacewatch || — || align=right | 4.1 km || 
|-id=499 bgcolor=#E9E9E9
| 101499 ||  || — || December 9, 1998 || Kitt Peak || Spacewatch || — || align=right | 3.0 km || 
|-id=500 bgcolor=#d6d6d6
| 101500 ||  || — || December 12, 1998 || Kitt Peak || Spacewatch || — || align=right | 4.7 km || 
|}

101501–101600 

|-bgcolor=#fefefe
| 101501 ||  || — || December 12, 1998 || Kitt Peak || Spacewatch || FLO || align=right | 1.4 km || 
|-id=502 bgcolor=#fefefe
| 101502 ||  || — || December 7, 1998 || Caussols || ODAS || NYS || align=right | 2.9 km || 
|-id=503 bgcolor=#E9E9E9
| 101503 ||  || — || December 8, 1998 || Caussols || ODAS || ADE || align=right | 6.0 km || 
|-id=504 bgcolor=#fefefe
| 101504 ||  || — || December 15, 1998 || Caussols || ODAS || NYS || align=right | 1.6 km || 
|-id=505 bgcolor=#d6d6d6
| 101505 ||  || — || December 14, 1998 || Socorro || LINEAR || — || align=right | 4.1 km || 
|-id=506 bgcolor=#fefefe
| 101506 ||  || — || December 13, 1998 || Rand || G. R. Viscome || — || align=right | 1.9 km || 
|-id=507 bgcolor=#E9E9E9
| 101507 ||  || — || December 8, 1998 || Kitt Peak || Spacewatch || HOF || align=right | 4.4 km || 
|-id=508 bgcolor=#d6d6d6
| 101508 ||  || — || December 10, 1998 || Kitt Peak || Spacewatch || — || align=right | 2.7 km || 
|-id=509 bgcolor=#E9E9E9
| 101509 ||  || — || December 10, 1998 || Kitt Peak || Spacewatch || — || align=right | 3.7 km || 
|-id=510 bgcolor=#E9E9E9
| 101510 ||  || — || December 11, 1998 || Kitt Peak || Spacewatch || — || align=right | 3.4 km || 
|-id=511 bgcolor=#E9E9E9
| 101511 ||  || — || December 11, 1998 || Kitt Peak || Spacewatch || HEN || align=right | 2.2 km || 
|-id=512 bgcolor=#d6d6d6
| 101512 ||  || — || December 14, 1998 || Kitt Peak || Spacewatch || — || align=right | 3.3 km || 
|-id=513 bgcolor=#d6d6d6
| 101513 ||  || — || December 14, 1998 || Kitt Peak || Spacewatch || — || align=right | 3.5 km || 
|-id=514 bgcolor=#fefefe
| 101514 ||  || — || December 15, 1998 || Socorro || LINEAR || H || align=right | 1.3 km || 
|-id=515 bgcolor=#E9E9E9
| 101515 ||  || — || December 15, 1998 || Socorro || LINEAR || BRU || align=right | 6.7 km || 
|-id=516 bgcolor=#d6d6d6
| 101516 ||  || — || December 14, 1998 || Socorro || LINEAR || — || align=right | 5.9 km || 
|-id=517 bgcolor=#fefefe
| 101517 ||  || — || December 14, 1998 || Socorro || LINEAR || V || align=right | 1.6 km || 
|-id=518 bgcolor=#fefefe
| 101518 ||  || — || December 14, 1998 || Socorro || LINEAR || — || align=right | 5.7 km || 
|-id=519 bgcolor=#E9E9E9
| 101519 ||  || — || December 14, 1998 || Socorro || LINEAR || — || align=right | 5.0 km || 
|-id=520 bgcolor=#fefefe
| 101520 ||  || — || December 14, 1998 || Socorro || LINEAR || — || align=right | 4.5 km || 
|-id=521 bgcolor=#fefefe
| 101521 ||  || — || December 15, 1998 || Socorro || LINEAR || — || align=right | 2.3 km || 
|-id=522 bgcolor=#fefefe
| 101522 ||  || — || December 14, 1998 || Socorro || LINEAR || — || align=right | 2.2 km || 
|-id=523 bgcolor=#fefefe
| 101523 ||  || — || December 14, 1998 || Socorro || LINEAR || — || align=right | 2.6 km || 
|-id=524 bgcolor=#fefefe
| 101524 ||  || — || December 14, 1998 || Socorro || LINEAR || NYS || align=right | 1.9 km || 
|-id=525 bgcolor=#E9E9E9
| 101525 ||  || — || December 14, 1998 || Socorro || LINEAR || RAF || align=right | 2.6 km || 
|-id=526 bgcolor=#fefefe
| 101526 ||  || — || December 14, 1998 || Socorro || LINEAR || MAS || align=right | 1.4 km || 
|-id=527 bgcolor=#E9E9E9
| 101527 ||  || — || December 15, 1998 || Socorro || LINEAR || ADE || align=right | 6.0 km || 
|-id=528 bgcolor=#d6d6d6
| 101528 ||  || — || December 15, 1998 || Socorro || LINEAR || — || align=right | 5.3 km || 
|-id=529 bgcolor=#E9E9E9
| 101529 ||  || — || December 15, 1998 || Socorro || LINEAR || — || align=right | 4.0 km || 
|-id=530 bgcolor=#fefefe
| 101530 ||  || — || December 8, 1998 || Anderson Mesa || LONEOS || NYS || align=right | 1.4 km || 
|-id=531 bgcolor=#fefefe
| 101531 ||  || — || December 11, 1998 || Anderson Mesa || LONEOS || NYS || align=right | 1.2 km || 
|-id=532 bgcolor=#fefefe
| 101532 ||  || — || December 11, 1998 || Anderson Mesa || LONEOS || NYS || align=right | 3.2 km || 
|-id=533 bgcolor=#d6d6d6
| 101533 ||  || — || December 26, 1998 || Prescott || P. G. Comba || — || align=right | 4.0 km || 
|-id=534 bgcolor=#d6d6d6
| 101534 ||  || — || December 25, 1998 || San Marcello || L. Tesi, A. Boattini || — || align=right | 6.8 km || 
|-id=535 bgcolor=#fefefe
| 101535 ||  || — || December 19, 1998 || Kitt Peak || Spacewatch || NYS || align=right | 1.5 km || 
|-id=536 bgcolor=#fefefe
| 101536 ||  || — || December 19, 1998 || Kitt Peak || Spacewatch || NYS || align=right | 1.4 km || 
|-id=537 bgcolor=#E9E9E9
| 101537 ||  || — || December 22, 1998 || Kitt Peak || Spacewatch || KON || align=right | 4.6 km || 
|-id=538 bgcolor=#d6d6d6
| 101538 ||  || — || December 22, 1998 || Kitt Peak || Spacewatch || — || align=right | 4.6 km || 
|-id=539 bgcolor=#d6d6d6
| 101539 ||  || — || December 22, 1998 || Kitt Peak || Spacewatch || — || align=right | 2.4 km || 
|-id=540 bgcolor=#fefefe
| 101540 ||  || — || December 22, 1998 || Kitt Peak || Spacewatch || — || align=right | 1.6 km || 
|-id=541 bgcolor=#E9E9E9
| 101541 ||  || — || December 22, 1998 || Kitt Peak || Spacewatch || — || align=right | 1.8 km || 
|-id=542 bgcolor=#fefefe
| 101542 ||  || — || December 25, 1998 || Kitt Peak || Spacewatch || NYS || align=right | 1.5 km || 
|-id=543 bgcolor=#d6d6d6
| 101543 ||  || — || December 26, 1998 || Kitt Peak || Spacewatch || THM || align=right | 4.6 km || 
|-id=544 bgcolor=#d6d6d6
| 101544 ||  || — || December 26, 1998 || Kitt Peak || Spacewatch || HYG || align=right | 5.9 km || 
|-id=545 bgcolor=#fefefe
| 101545 ||  || — || December 16, 1998 || Socorro || LINEAR || — || align=right | 1.7 km || 
|-id=546 bgcolor=#E9E9E9
| 101546 ||  || — || December 16, 1998 || Socorro || LINEAR || — || align=right | 6.0 km || 
|-id=547 bgcolor=#d6d6d6
| 101547 ||  || — || December 27, 1998 || Anderson Mesa || LONEOS || TIR || align=right | 4.0 km || 
|-id=548 bgcolor=#fefefe
| 101548 ||  || — || December 27, 1998 || Anderson Mesa || LONEOS || — || align=right | 2.6 km || 
|-id=549 bgcolor=#fefefe
| 101549 ||  || — || December 27, 1998 || Anderson Mesa || LONEOS || H || align=right | 2.9 km || 
|-id=550 bgcolor=#fefefe
| 101550 || 1999 AE || — || January 5, 1999 || Višnjan Observatory || K. Korlević || ERI || align=right | 4.4 km || 
|-id=551 bgcolor=#E9E9E9
| 101551 ||  || — || January 7, 1999 || Kitt Peak || Spacewatch || — || align=right | 1.6 km || 
|-id=552 bgcolor=#d6d6d6
| 101552 ||  || — || January 7, 1999 || Kitt Peak || Spacewatch || — || align=right | 2.7 km || 
|-id=553 bgcolor=#fefefe
| 101553 ||  || — || January 10, 1999 || Oizumi || T. Kobayashi || H || align=right | 1.6 km || 
|-id=554 bgcolor=#FA8072
| 101554 ||  || — || January 9, 1999 || Socorro || LINEAR || — || align=right | 2.0 km || 
|-id=555 bgcolor=#E9E9E9
| 101555 ||  || — || January 12, 1999 || Oizumi || T. Kobayashi || EUN || align=right | 3.1 km || 
|-id=556 bgcolor=#fefefe
| 101556 ||  || — || January 12, 1999 || Oizumi || T. Kobayashi || — || align=right | 1.9 km || 
|-id=557 bgcolor=#fefefe
| 101557 ||  || — || January 9, 1999 || Višnjan Observatory || K. Korlević || — || align=right | 2.7 km || 
|-id=558 bgcolor=#E9E9E9
| 101558 ||  || — || January 13, 1999 || Oizumi || T. Kobayashi || — || align=right | 9.4 km || 
|-id=559 bgcolor=#d6d6d6
| 101559 ||  || — || January 9, 1999 || Xinglong || SCAP || — || align=right | 5.4 km || 
|-id=560 bgcolor=#d6d6d6
| 101560 ||  || — || January 7, 1999 || Kitt Peak || Spacewatch || — || align=right | 3.9 km || 
|-id=561 bgcolor=#d6d6d6
| 101561 ||  || — || January 8, 1999 || Kitt Peak || Spacewatch || — || align=right | 4.1 km || 
|-id=562 bgcolor=#E9E9E9
| 101562 ||  || — || January 8, 1999 || Kitt Peak || Spacewatch || — || align=right | 3.7 km || 
|-id=563 bgcolor=#d6d6d6
| 101563 ||  || — || January 9, 1999 || Kitt Peak || Spacewatch || — || align=right | 4.5 km || 
|-id=564 bgcolor=#E9E9E9
| 101564 ||  || — || January 11, 1999 || Kitt Peak || Spacewatch || NEM || align=right | 4.1 km || 
|-id=565 bgcolor=#fefefe
| 101565 ||  || — || January 13, 1999 || Gekko || T. Kagawa || SUL || align=right | 5.7 km || 
|-id=566 bgcolor=#E9E9E9
| 101566 ||  || — || January 14, 1999 || Višnjan Observatory || K. Korlević || — || align=right | 3.3 km || 
|-id=567 bgcolor=#E9E9E9
| 101567 ||  || — || January 15, 1999 || Catalina || CSS || — || align=right | 8.2 km || 
|-id=568 bgcolor=#E9E9E9
| 101568 ||  || — || January 14, 1999 || Kitt Peak || Spacewatch || — || align=right | 2.4 km || 
|-id=569 bgcolor=#fefefe
| 101569 ||  || — || January 14, 1999 || Kitt Peak || Spacewatch || NYS || align=right | 1.3 km || 
|-id=570 bgcolor=#E9E9E9
| 101570 ||  || — || January 14, 1999 || Socorro || LINEAR || — || align=right | 3.9 km || 
|-id=571 bgcolor=#fefefe
| 101571 ||  || — || January 9, 1999 || Anderson Mesa || LONEOS || — || align=right | 2.2 km || 
|-id=572 bgcolor=#fefefe
| 101572 || 1999 BF || — || January 16, 1999 || Oizumi || T. Kobayashi || — || align=right | 2.8 km || 
|-id=573 bgcolor=#fefefe
| 101573 || 1999 BQ || — || January 16, 1999 || Višnjan Observatory || K. Korlević || — || align=right | 3.7 km || 
|-id=574 bgcolor=#d6d6d6
| 101574 ||  || — || January 17, 1999 || Catalina || CSS || Tj (2.99) || align=right | 11 km || 
|-id=575 bgcolor=#fefefe
| 101575 ||  || — || January 18, 1999 || Catalina || CSS || PHO || align=right | 2.2 km || 
|-id=576 bgcolor=#E9E9E9
| 101576 ||  || — || January 19, 1999 || Caussols || ODAS || — || align=right | 2.1 km || 
|-id=577 bgcolor=#E9E9E9
| 101577 ||  || — || January 18, 1999 || Oizumi || T. Kobayashi || — || align=right | 3.7 km || 
|-id=578 bgcolor=#fefefe
| 101578 ||  || — || January 20, 1999 || Kleť || Kleť Obs. || V || align=right | 1.1 km || 
|-id=579 bgcolor=#E9E9E9
| 101579 ||  || — || January 19, 1999 || Caussols || ODAS || — || align=right | 3.2 km || 
|-id=580 bgcolor=#E9E9E9
| 101580 ||  || — || January 21, 1999 || Višnjan Observatory || K. Korlević || — || align=right | 2.6 km || 
|-id=581 bgcolor=#d6d6d6
| 101581 ||  || — || January 21, 1999 || Višnjan Observatory || K. Korlević || — || align=right | 5.8 km || 
|-id=582 bgcolor=#fefefe
| 101582 ||  || — || January 22, 1999 || Višnjan Observatory || K. Korlević || — || align=right | 2.3 km || 
|-id=583 bgcolor=#E9E9E9
| 101583 ||  || — || January 23, 1999 || Višnjan Observatory || K. Korlević || — || align=right | 2.9 km || 
|-id=584 bgcolor=#fefefe
| 101584 ||  || — || January 19, 1999 || Caussols || ODAS || — || align=right | 1.4 km || 
|-id=585 bgcolor=#E9E9E9
| 101585 ||  || — || January 20, 1999 || Caussols || ODAS || — || align=right | 3.3 km || 
|-id=586 bgcolor=#fefefe
| 101586 ||  || — || January 20, 1999 || Caussols || ODAS || H || align=right data-sort-value="0.96" | 960 m || 
|-id=587 bgcolor=#fefefe
| 101587 ||  || — || January 22, 1999 || Oizumi || T. Kobayashi || — || align=right | 3.5 km || 
|-id=588 bgcolor=#d6d6d6
| 101588 ||  || — || January 24, 1999 || Monte Agliale || M. M. M. Santangelo, G. Cavalletti || — || align=right | 7.9 km || 
|-id=589 bgcolor=#fefefe
| 101589 ||  || — || January 16, 1999 || Višnjan Observatory || K. Korlević || V || align=right | 1.5 km || 
|-id=590 bgcolor=#fefefe
| 101590 ||  || — || January 16, 1999 || Socorro || LINEAR || V || align=right | 1.7 km || 
|-id=591 bgcolor=#fefefe
| 101591 ||  || — || January 16, 1999 || Socorro || LINEAR || FLO || align=right | 2.3 km || 
|-id=592 bgcolor=#fefefe
| 101592 ||  || — || January 18, 1999 || Socorro || LINEAR || — || align=right | 2.4 km || 
|-id=593 bgcolor=#E9E9E9
| 101593 ||  || — || January 18, 1999 || Socorro || LINEAR || — || align=right | 2.7 km || 
|-id=594 bgcolor=#E9E9E9
| 101594 ||  || — || January 26, 1999 || Višnjan Observatory || K. Korlević || — || align=right | 3.0 km || 
|-id=595 bgcolor=#d6d6d6
| 101595 ||  || — || January 16, 1999 || Kitt Peak || Spacewatch || — || align=right | 5.1 km || 
|-id=596 bgcolor=#fefefe
| 101596 ||  || — || January 17, 1999 || Kitt Peak || Spacewatch || — || align=right | 1.8 km || 
|-id=597 bgcolor=#d6d6d6
| 101597 ||  || — || January 19, 1999 || Kitt Peak || Spacewatch || — || align=right | 5.2 km || 
|-id=598 bgcolor=#E9E9E9
| 101598 ||  || — || January 22, 1999 || Kitt Peak || Spacewatch || — || align=right | 1.6 km || 
|-id=599 bgcolor=#d6d6d6
| 101599 ||  || — || January 17, 1999 || Anderson Mesa || LONEOS || TIR || align=right | 4.3 km || 
|-id=600 bgcolor=#d6d6d6
| 101600 ||  || — || January 20, 1999 || Catalina || CSS || EUP || align=right | 10 km || 
|}

101601–101700 

|-bgcolor=#E9E9E9
| 101601 || 1999 CM || — || February 4, 1999 || Gekko || T. Kagawa || — || align=right | 6.3 km || 
|-id=602 bgcolor=#d6d6d6
| 101602 ||  || — || February 7, 1999 || Oizumi || T. Kobayashi || — || align=right | 6.9 km || 
|-id=603 bgcolor=#E9E9E9
| 101603 ||  || — || February 8, 1999 || Oizumi || T. Kobayashi || — || align=right | 2.9 km || 
|-id=604 bgcolor=#FA8072
| 101604 ||  || — || February 10, 1999 || Socorro || LINEAR || H || align=right | 1.4 km || 
|-id=605 bgcolor=#fefefe
| 101605 ||  || — || February 10, 1999 || Socorro || LINEAR || — || align=right | 3.4 km || 
|-id=606 bgcolor=#E9E9E9
| 101606 ||  || — || February 10, 1999 || Socorro || LINEAR || HNS || align=right | 2.2 km || 
|-id=607 bgcolor=#E9E9E9
| 101607 ||  || — || February 10, 1999 || Socorro || LINEAR || — || align=right | 6.9 km || 
|-id=608 bgcolor=#fefefe
| 101608 ||  || — || February 10, 1999 || Socorro || LINEAR || H || align=right | 1.2 km || 
|-id=609 bgcolor=#d6d6d6
| 101609 ||  || — || February 10, 1999 || Socorro || LINEAR || EUP || align=right | 6.9 km || 
|-id=610 bgcolor=#FA8072
| 101610 ||  || — || February 10, 1999 || Socorro || LINEAR || — || align=right | 1.6 km || 
|-id=611 bgcolor=#E9E9E9
| 101611 ||  || — || February 13, 1999 || Oizumi || T. Kobayashi || JUN || align=right | 2.5 km || 
|-id=612 bgcolor=#C2FFFF
| 101612 ||  || — || February 13, 1999 || Kitt Peak || Spacewatch || L4 || align=right | 20 km || 
|-id=613 bgcolor=#E9E9E9
| 101613 ||  || — || February 12, 1999 || Prescott || P. G. Comba || — || align=right | 2.1 km || 
|-id=614 bgcolor=#fefefe
| 101614 ||  || — || February 12, 1999 || Prescott || P. G. Comba || — || align=right | 2.0 km || 
|-id=615 bgcolor=#E9E9E9
| 101615 ||  || — || February 14, 1999 || Farpoint || G. Hug, G. Bell || EUN || align=right | 2.3 km || 
|-id=616 bgcolor=#E9E9E9
| 101616 ||  || — || February 12, 1999 || Oohira || T. Urata || — || align=right | 4.4 km || 
|-id=617 bgcolor=#d6d6d6
| 101617 ||  || — || February 13, 1999 || Oohira || T. Urata || — || align=right | 5.2 km || 
|-id=618 bgcolor=#fefefe
| 101618 ||  || — || February 14, 1999 || Oizumi || T. Kobayashi || — || align=right | 2.2 km || 
|-id=619 bgcolor=#fefefe
| 101619 ||  || — || February 12, 1999 || Socorro || LINEAR || — || align=right | 2.5 km || 
|-id=620 bgcolor=#E9E9E9
| 101620 ||  || — || February 15, 1999 || Višnjan Observatory || K. Korlević || — || align=right | 4.0 km || 
|-id=621 bgcolor=#E9E9E9
| 101621 ||  || — || February 15, 1999 || Kleť || Kleť Obs. || — || align=right | 1.9 km || 
|-id=622 bgcolor=#E9E9E9
| 101622 ||  || — || February 15, 1999 || Višnjan Observatory || K. Korlević || — || align=right | 4.9 km || 
|-id=623 bgcolor=#fefefe
| 101623 ||  || — || February 10, 1999 || Socorro || LINEAR || — || align=right | 5.6 km || 
|-id=624 bgcolor=#d6d6d6
| 101624 ||  || — || February 10, 1999 || Socorro || LINEAR || — || align=right | 7.2 km || 
|-id=625 bgcolor=#E9E9E9
| 101625 ||  || — || February 10, 1999 || Socorro || LINEAR || — || align=right | 3.2 km || 
|-id=626 bgcolor=#fefefe
| 101626 ||  || — || February 10, 1999 || Socorro || LINEAR || NYS || align=right | 1.5 km || 
|-id=627 bgcolor=#d6d6d6
| 101627 ||  || — || February 10, 1999 || Socorro || LINEAR || — || align=right | 8.2 km || 
|-id=628 bgcolor=#d6d6d6
| 101628 ||  || — || February 10, 1999 || Socorro || LINEAR || TIR || align=right | 3.3 km || 
|-id=629 bgcolor=#fefefe
| 101629 ||  || — || February 10, 1999 || Socorro || LINEAR || — || align=right | 2.4 km || 
|-id=630 bgcolor=#E9E9E9
| 101630 ||  || — || February 10, 1999 || Socorro || LINEAR || — || align=right | 2.9 km || 
|-id=631 bgcolor=#E9E9E9
| 101631 ||  || — || February 10, 1999 || Socorro || LINEAR || — || align=right | 2.4 km || 
|-id=632 bgcolor=#d6d6d6
| 101632 ||  || — || February 10, 1999 || Socorro || LINEAR || — || align=right | 5.1 km || 
|-id=633 bgcolor=#E9E9E9
| 101633 ||  || — || February 10, 1999 || Socorro || LINEAR || — || align=right | 3.9 km || 
|-id=634 bgcolor=#d6d6d6
| 101634 ||  || — || February 10, 1999 || Socorro || LINEAR || EUP || align=right | 7.3 km || 
|-id=635 bgcolor=#d6d6d6
| 101635 ||  || — || February 10, 1999 || Socorro || LINEAR || TIR || align=right | 7.3 km || 
|-id=636 bgcolor=#d6d6d6
| 101636 ||  || — || February 10, 1999 || Socorro || LINEAR || — || align=right | 6.1 km || 
|-id=637 bgcolor=#E9E9E9
| 101637 ||  || — || February 10, 1999 || Socorro || LINEAR || — || align=right | 2.4 km || 
|-id=638 bgcolor=#d6d6d6
| 101638 ||  || — || February 10, 1999 || Socorro || LINEAR || — || align=right | 8.1 km || 
|-id=639 bgcolor=#d6d6d6
| 101639 ||  || — || February 10, 1999 || Socorro || LINEAR || ALA || align=right | 7.9 km || 
|-id=640 bgcolor=#E9E9E9
| 101640 ||  || — || February 10, 1999 || Socorro || LINEAR || EUN || align=right | 2.9 km || 
|-id=641 bgcolor=#E9E9E9
| 101641 ||  || — || February 10, 1999 || Socorro || LINEAR || — || align=right | 3.7 km || 
|-id=642 bgcolor=#d6d6d6
| 101642 ||  || — || February 10, 1999 || Socorro || LINEAR || — || align=right | 4.2 km || 
|-id=643 bgcolor=#d6d6d6
| 101643 ||  || — || February 10, 1999 || Socorro || LINEAR || — || align=right | 8.6 km || 
|-id=644 bgcolor=#E9E9E9
| 101644 ||  || — || February 10, 1999 || Socorro || LINEAR || — || align=right | 2.5 km || 
|-id=645 bgcolor=#E9E9E9
| 101645 ||  || — || February 10, 1999 || Socorro || LINEAR || — || align=right | 1.8 km || 
|-id=646 bgcolor=#E9E9E9
| 101646 ||  || — || February 10, 1999 || Socorro || LINEAR || — || align=right | 2.6 km || 
|-id=647 bgcolor=#d6d6d6
| 101647 ||  || — || February 10, 1999 || Socorro || LINEAR || THB || align=right | 6.4 km || 
|-id=648 bgcolor=#fefefe
| 101648 ||  || — || February 10, 1999 || Socorro || LINEAR || — || align=right | 2.0 km || 
|-id=649 bgcolor=#d6d6d6
| 101649 ||  || — || February 12, 1999 || Socorro || LINEAR || TIR || align=right | 5.1 km || 
|-id=650 bgcolor=#d6d6d6
| 101650 ||  || — || February 12, 1999 || Socorro || LINEAR || — || align=right | 5.1 km || 
|-id=651 bgcolor=#d6d6d6
| 101651 ||  || — || February 12, 1999 || Socorro || LINEAR || — || align=right | 3.7 km || 
|-id=652 bgcolor=#d6d6d6
| 101652 ||  || — || February 12, 1999 || Socorro || LINEAR || — || align=right | 6.0 km || 
|-id=653 bgcolor=#E9E9E9
| 101653 ||  || — || February 12, 1999 || Socorro || LINEAR || — || align=right | 4.4 km || 
|-id=654 bgcolor=#E9E9E9
| 101654 ||  || — || February 12, 1999 || Socorro || LINEAR || — || align=right | 2.7 km || 
|-id=655 bgcolor=#E9E9E9
| 101655 ||  || — || February 12, 1999 || Socorro || LINEAR || — || align=right | 3.4 km || 
|-id=656 bgcolor=#E9E9E9
| 101656 ||  || — || February 12, 1999 || Socorro || LINEAR || — || align=right | 2.8 km || 
|-id=657 bgcolor=#E9E9E9
| 101657 ||  || — || February 12, 1999 || Socorro || LINEAR || MAR || align=right | 3.2 km || 
|-id=658 bgcolor=#fefefe
| 101658 ||  || — || February 12, 1999 || Socorro || LINEAR || NYS || align=right | 1.7 km || 
|-id=659 bgcolor=#E9E9E9
| 101659 ||  || — || February 12, 1999 || Socorro || LINEAR || — || align=right | 3.3 km || 
|-id=660 bgcolor=#d6d6d6
| 101660 ||  || — || February 12, 1999 || Socorro || LINEAR || — || align=right | 3.1 km || 
|-id=661 bgcolor=#fefefe
| 101661 ||  || — || February 10, 1999 || Socorro || LINEAR || KLI || align=right | 3.8 km || 
|-id=662 bgcolor=#fefefe
| 101662 ||  || — || February 10, 1999 || Socorro || LINEAR || — || align=right | 3.1 km || 
|-id=663 bgcolor=#fefefe
| 101663 ||  || — || February 10, 1999 || Socorro || LINEAR || — || align=right | 2.4 km || 
|-id=664 bgcolor=#d6d6d6
| 101664 ||  || — || February 10, 1999 || Socorro || LINEAR || EOS || align=right | 3.4 km || 
|-id=665 bgcolor=#E9E9E9
| 101665 ||  || — || February 10, 1999 || Socorro || LINEAR || EUN || align=right | 4.3 km || 
|-id=666 bgcolor=#E9E9E9
| 101666 ||  || — || February 10, 1999 || Socorro || LINEAR || MAR || align=right | 3.7 km || 
|-id=667 bgcolor=#fefefe
| 101667 ||  || — || February 10, 1999 || Socorro || LINEAR || V || align=right | 2.8 km || 
|-id=668 bgcolor=#d6d6d6
| 101668 ||  || — || February 10, 1999 || Socorro || LINEAR || HYG || align=right | 6.9 km || 
|-id=669 bgcolor=#fefefe
| 101669 ||  || — || February 10, 1999 || Socorro || LINEAR || — || align=right | 2.0 km || 
|-id=670 bgcolor=#E9E9E9
| 101670 ||  || — || February 10, 1999 || Socorro || LINEAR || — || align=right | 3.1 km || 
|-id=671 bgcolor=#d6d6d6
| 101671 ||  || — || February 10, 1999 || Socorro || LINEAR || — || align=right | 6.5 km || 
|-id=672 bgcolor=#E9E9E9
| 101672 ||  || — || February 10, 1999 || Socorro || LINEAR || — || align=right | 2.6 km || 
|-id=673 bgcolor=#d6d6d6
| 101673 ||  || — || February 12, 1999 || Socorro || LINEAR || THM || align=right | 5.8 km || 
|-id=674 bgcolor=#d6d6d6
| 101674 ||  || — || February 12, 1999 || Socorro || LINEAR || Tj (2.94) || align=right | 6.1 km || 
|-id=675 bgcolor=#d6d6d6
| 101675 ||  || — || February 12, 1999 || Socorro || LINEAR || — || align=right | 5.8 km || 
|-id=676 bgcolor=#d6d6d6
| 101676 ||  || — || February 12, 1999 || Socorro || LINEAR || EOS || align=right | 4.2 km || 
|-id=677 bgcolor=#E9E9E9
| 101677 ||  || — || February 12, 1999 || Socorro || LINEAR || — || align=right | 4.1 km || 
|-id=678 bgcolor=#E9E9E9
| 101678 ||  || — || February 12, 1999 || Socorro || LINEAR || — || align=right | 3.0 km || 
|-id=679 bgcolor=#E9E9E9
| 101679 ||  || — || February 12, 1999 || Socorro || LINEAR || — || align=right | 8.1 km || 
|-id=680 bgcolor=#E9E9E9
| 101680 ||  || — || February 12, 1999 || Socorro || LINEAR || — || align=right | 2.8 km || 
|-id=681 bgcolor=#E9E9E9
| 101681 ||  || — || February 12, 1999 || Socorro || LINEAR || — || align=right | 3.1 km || 
|-id=682 bgcolor=#E9E9E9
| 101682 ||  || — || February 12, 1999 || Socorro || LINEAR || — || align=right | 5.5 km || 
|-id=683 bgcolor=#E9E9E9
| 101683 ||  || — || February 12, 1999 || Socorro || LINEAR || — || align=right | 2.4 km || 
|-id=684 bgcolor=#E9E9E9
| 101684 ||  || — || February 12, 1999 || Socorro || LINEAR || — || align=right | 3.3 km || 
|-id=685 bgcolor=#d6d6d6
| 101685 ||  || — || February 12, 1999 || Socorro || LINEAR || TIR || align=right | 11 km || 
|-id=686 bgcolor=#fefefe
| 101686 ||  || — || February 12, 1999 || Socorro || LINEAR || FLO || align=right | 1.3 km || 
|-id=687 bgcolor=#E9E9E9
| 101687 ||  || — || February 12, 1999 || Socorro || LINEAR || GEF || align=right | 2.5 km || 
|-id=688 bgcolor=#E9E9E9
| 101688 ||  || — || February 12, 1999 || Socorro || LINEAR || KON || align=right | 7.1 km || 
|-id=689 bgcolor=#E9E9E9
| 101689 ||  || — || February 11, 1999 || Socorro || LINEAR || EUN || align=right | 2.5 km || 
|-id=690 bgcolor=#fefefe
| 101690 ||  || — || February 11, 1999 || Socorro || LINEAR || KLI || align=right | 4.5 km || 
|-id=691 bgcolor=#d6d6d6
| 101691 ||  || — || February 11, 1999 || Socorro || LINEAR || — || align=right | 3.7 km || 
|-id=692 bgcolor=#d6d6d6
| 101692 ||  || — || February 11, 1999 || Socorro || LINEAR || — || align=right | 3.5 km || 
|-id=693 bgcolor=#fefefe
| 101693 ||  || — || February 11, 1999 || Socorro || LINEAR || — || align=right | 1.7 km || 
|-id=694 bgcolor=#E9E9E9
| 101694 ||  || — || February 11, 1999 || Socorro || LINEAR || — || align=right | 4.8 km || 
|-id=695 bgcolor=#E9E9E9
| 101695 ||  || — || February 8, 1999 || Kitt Peak || Spacewatch || — || align=right | 3.5 km || 
|-id=696 bgcolor=#d6d6d6
| 101696 ||  || — || February 8, 1999 || Kitt Peak || Spacewatch || — || align=right | 6.4 km || 
|-id=697 bgcolor=#fefefe
| 101697 ||  || — || February 9, 1999 || Kitt Peak || Spacewatch || — || align=right | 1.6 km || 
|-id=698 bgcolor=#d6d6d6
| 101698 ||  || — || February 9, 1999 || Kitt Peak || Spacewatch || — || align=right | 3.1 km || 
|-id=699 bgcolor=#E9E9E9
| 101699 ||  || — || February 9, 1999 || Kitt Peak || Spacewatch || — || align=right | 2.4 km || 
|-id=700 bgcolor=#E9E9E9
| 101700 ||  || — || February 13, 1999 || Kitt Peak || Spacewatch || HOF || align=right | 5.2 km || 
|}

101701–101800 

|-bgcolor=#E9E9E9
| 101701 ||  || — || February 13, 1999 || Kitt Peak || Spacewatch || — || align=right | 2.1 km || 
|-id=702 bgcolor=#d6d6d6
| 101702 ||  || — || February 13, 1999 || Kitt Peak || Spacewatch || THM || align=right | 4.2 km || 
|-id=703 bgcolor=#E9E9E9
| 101703 ||  || — || February 13, 1999 || Kitt Peak || Spacewatch || — || align=right | 2.6 km || 
|-id=704 bgcolor=#d6d6d6
| 101704 ||  || — || February 13, 1999 || Kitt Peak || Spacewatch || EUP || align=right | 7.4 km || 
|-id=705 bgcolor=#d6d6d6
| 101705 ||  || — || February 12, 1999 || Kitt Peak || Spacewatch || THM || align=right | 4.0 km || 
|-id=706 bgcolor=#E9E9E9
| 101706 ||  || — || February 13, 1999 || Kitt Peak || Spacewatch || EUN || align=right | 2.6 km || 
|-id=707 bgcolor=#E9E9E9
| 101707 ||  || — || February 13, 1999 || Anderson Mesa || LONEOS || JUN || align=right | 2.8 km || 
|-id=708 bgcolor=#fefefe
| 101708 ||  || — || February 12, 1999 || Anderson Mesa || LONEOS || — || align=right | 1.5 km || 
|-id=709 bgcolor=#E9E9E9
| 101709 ||  || — || February 8, 1999 || Kitt Peak || Spacewatch || — || align=right | 1.4 km || 
|-id=710 bgcolor=#d6d6d6
| 101710 || 1999 DQ || — || February 16, 1999 || Caussols || ODAS || URS || align=right | 6.3 km || 
|-id=711 bgcolor=#E9E9E9
| 101711 ||  || — || February 18, 1999 || Haleakala || NEAT || — || align=right | 2.5 km || 
|-id=712 bgcolor=#E9E9E9
| 101712 ||  || — || February 20, 1999 || Oizumi || T. Kobayashi || — || align=right | 3.3 km || 
|-id=713 bgcolor=#d6d6d6
| 101713 Marston ||  ||  || February 20, 1999 || Goodricke-Pigott || R. A. Tucker || — || align=right | 5.7 km || 
|-id=714 bgcolor=#E9E9E9
| 101714 ||  || — || February 17, 1999 || Socorro || LINEAR || — || align=right | 3.0 km || 
|-id=715 bgcolor=#d6d6d6
| 101715 ||  || — || February 17, 1999 || Socorro || LINEAR || — || align=right | 6.7 km || 
|-id=716 bgcolor=#E9E9E9
| 101716 ||  || — || February 18, 1999 || Socorro || LINEAR || — || align=right | 13 km || 
|-id=717 bgcolor=#E9E9E9
| 101717 ||  || — || February 18, 1999 || Anderson Mesa || LONEOS || — || align=right | 3.7 km || 
|-id=718 bgcolor=#E9E9E9
| 101718 || 1999 EB || — || March 6, 1999 || Prescott || P. G. Comba || — || align=right | 3.5 km || 
|-id=719 bgcolor=#d6d6d6
| 101719 || 1999 EF || — || March 10, 1999 || Prescott || P. G. Comba || — || align=right | 4.6 km || 
|-id=720 bgcolor=#E9E9E9
| 101720 ||  || — || March 6, 1999 || Kitt Peak || Spacewatch || — || align=right | 1.3 km || 
|-id=721 bgcolor=#d6d6d6
| 101721 Emanuelfritsch ||  ||  || March 13, 1999 || Kleť || J. Tichá, M. Tichý || — || align=right | 5.2 km || 
|-id=722 bgcolor=#d6d6d6
| 101722 Pursell ||  ||  || March 10, 1999 || Baton Rouge || W. R. Cooney Jr. || ALA || align=right | 10 km || 
|-id=723 bgcolor=#E9E9E9
| 101723 Finger ||  ||  || March 13, 1999 || Goodricke-Pigott || R. A. Tucker || — || align=right | 1.8 km || 
|-id=724 bgcolor=#E9E9E9
| 101724 ||  || — || March 12, 1999 || Kitt Peak || Spacewatch || BRU || align=right | 9.2 km || 
|-id=725 bgcolor=#E9E9E9
| 101725 ||  || — || March 13, 1999 || Kitt Peak || Spacewatch || — || align=right | 4.2 km || 
|-id=726 bgcolor=#E9E9E9
| 101726 ||  || — || March 14, 1999 || Kitt Peak || Spacewatch || — || align=right | 4.1 km || 
|-id=727 bgcolor=#fefefe
| 101727 ||  || — || March 15, 1999 || Socorro || LINEAR || H || align=right | 1.7 km || 
|-id=728 bgcolor=#E9E9E9
| 101728 ||  || — || March 12, 1999 || Kitt Peak || Spacewatch || — || align=right | 2.2 km || 
|-id=729 bgcolor=#E9E9E9
| 101729 ||  || — || March 15, 1999 || Kitt Peak || Spacewatch || — || align=right | 3.4 km || 
|-id=730 bgcolor=#E9E9E9
| 101730 ||  || — || March 14, 1999 || Kitt Peak || Spacewatch || — || align=right | 1.3 km || 
|-id=731 bgcolor=#E9E9E9
| 101731 ||  || — || March 14, 1999 || Kitt Peak || Spacewatch || — || align=right | 1.9 km || 
|-id=732 bgcolor=#E9E9E9
| 101732 ||  || — || March 15, 1999 || Socorro || LINEAR || — || align=right | 3.0 km || 
|-id=733 bgcolor=#E9E9E9
| 101733 ||  || — || March 15, 1999 || Socorro || LINEAR || — || align=right | 7.8 km || 
|-id=734 bgcolor=#d6d6d6
| 101734 ||  || — || March 16, 1999 || Kitt Peak || Spacewatch || — || align=right | 7.8 km || 
|-id=735 bgcolor=#d6d6d6
| 101735 ||  || — || March 16, 1999 || Kitt Peak || Spacewatch || — || align=right | 8.4 km || 
|-id=736 bgcolor=#E9E9E9
| 101736 ||  || — || March 17, 1999 || Kitt Peak || Spacewatch || — || align=right | 1.9 km || 
|-id=737 bgcolor=#fefefe
| 101737 ||  || — || March 19, 1999 || Socorro || LINEAR || H || align=right | 1.5 km || 
|-id=738 bgcolor=#fefefe
| 101738 ||  || — || March 17, 1999 || Kitt Peak || Spacewatch || — || align=right | 1.7 km || 
|-id=739 bgcolor=#E9E9E9
| 101739 ||  || — || March 19, 1999 || Caussols || ODAS || — || align=right | 4.3 km || 
|-id=740 bgcolor=#E9E9E9
| 101740 ||  || — || March 20, 1999 || Caussols || ODAS || EUN || align=right | 4.9 km || 
|-id=741 bgcolor=#fefefe
| 101741 ||  || — || March 19, 1999 || Socorro || LINEAR || PHO || align=right | 2.9 km || 
|-id=742 bgcolor=#FA8072
| 101742 ||  || — || March 20, 1999 || Socorro || LINEAR || — || align=right | 8.1 km || 
|-id=743 bgcolor=#fefefe
| 101743 ||  || — || March 20, 1999 || Socorro || LINEAR || H || align=right | 1.0 km || 
|-id=744 bgcolor=#E9E9E9
| 101744 ||  || — || March 20, 1999 || Socorro || LINEAR || — || align=right | 5.1 km || 
|-id=745 bgcolor=#fefefe
| 101745 ||  || — || March 20, 1999 || Socorro || LINEAR || H || align=right | 1.0 km || 
|-id=746 bgcolor=#d6d6d6
| 101746 ||  || — || March 22, 1999 || Needville || Needville Obs. || — || align=right | 5.6 km || 
|-id=747 bgcolor=#d6d6d6
| 101747 ||  || — || March 18, 1999 || Kitt Peak || Spacewatch || — || align=right | 4.4 km || 
|-id=748 bgcolor=#E9E9E9
| 101748 ||  || — || March 19, 1999 || Kitt Peak || Spacewatch || — || align=right | 2.4 km || 
|-id=749 bgcolor=#fefefe
| 101749 ||  || — || March 23, 1999 || Kitt Peak || Spacewatch || — || align=right | 1.1 km || 
|-id=750 bgcolor=#d6d6d6
| 101750 ||  || — || March 23, 1999 || Kitt Peak || Spacewatch || — || align=right | 3.0 km || 
|-id=751 bgcolor=#d6d6d6
| 101751 ||  || — || March 23, 1999 || Kitt Peak || Spacewatch || THM || align=right | 3.2 km || 
|-id=752 bgcolor=#E9E9E9
| 101752 ||  || — || March 22, 1999 || Anderson Mesa || LONEOS || CLO || align=right | 7.2 km || 
|-id=753 bgcolor=#E9E9E9
| 101753 ||  || — || March 24, 1999 || Monte Agliale || M. M. M. Santangelo || — || align=right | 1.9 km || 
|-id=754 bgcolor=#E9E9E9
| 101754 ||  || — || March 19, 1999 || Kitt Peak || Spacewatch || — || align=right | 4.4 km || 
|-id=755 bgcolor=#d6d6d6
| 101755 ||  || — || March 19, 1999 || Socorro || LINEAR || THB || align=right | 6.3 km || 
|-id=756 bgcolor=#fefefe
| 101756 ||  || — || March 19, 1999 || Socorro || LINEAR || V || align=right | 1.6 km || 
|-id=757 bgcolor=#E9E9E9
| 101757 ||  || — || March 19, 1999 || Socorro || LINEAR || — || align=right | 3.1 km || 
|-id=758 bgcolor=#d6d6d6
| 101758 ||  || — || March 19, 1999 || Socorro || LINEAR || — || align=right | 3.1 km || 
|-id=759 bgcolor=#E9E9E9
| 101759 ||  || — || March 19, 1999 || Socorro || LINEAR || — || align=right | 6.2 km || 
|-id=760 bgcolor=#E9E9E9
| 101760 ||  || — || March 19, 1999 || Socorro || LINEAR || — || align=right | 4.8 km || 
|-id=761 bgcolor=#d6d6d6
| 101761 ||  || — || March 20, 1999 || Socorro || LINEAR || — || align=right | 6.6 km || 
|-id=762 bgcolor=#E9E9E9
| 101762 ||  || — || March 20, 1999 || Socorro || LINEAR || — || align=right | 3.6 km || 
|-id=763 bgcolor=#d6d6d6
| 101763 ||  || — || March 20, 1999 || Socorro || LINEAR || — || align=right | 5.9 km || 
|-id=764 bgcolor=#d6d6d6
| 101764 ||  || — || March 20, 1999 || Socorro || LINEAR || — || align=right | 5.4 km || 
|-id=765 bgcolor=#E9E9E9
| 101765 ||  || — || March 20, 1999 || Socorro || LINEAR || ADE || align=right | 3.8 km || 
|-id=766 bgcolor=#E9E9E9
| 101766 ||  || — || March 20, 1999 || Socorro || LINEAR || — || align=right | 3.6 km || 
|-id=767 bgcolor=#d6d6d6
| 101767 ||  || — || March 20, 1999 || Socorro || LINEAR || — || align=right | 3.6 km || 
|-id=768 bgcolor=#E9E9E9
| 101768 ||  || — || March 20, 1999 || Socorro || LINEAR || EUN || align=right | 3.4 km || 
|-id=769 bgcolor=#E9E9E9
| 101769 ||  || — || March 20, 1999 || Socorro || LINEAR || — || align=right | 4.3 km || 
|-id=770 bgcolor=#d6d6d6
| 101770 ||  || — || March 20, 1999 || Socorro || LINEAR || HYG || align=right | 5.5 km || 
|-id=771 bgcolor=#E9E9E9
| 101771 ||  || — || March 20, 1999 || Socorro || LINEAR || MAR || align=right | 2.7 km || 
|-id=772 bgcolor=#E9E9E9
| 101772 ||  || — || March 18, 1999 || Kitt Peak || Spacewatch || EUN || align=right | 3.7 km || 
|-id=773 bgcolor=#d6d6d6
| 101773 ||  || — || March 22, 1999 || Anderson Mesa || LONEOS || — || align=right | 6.4 km || 
|-id=774 bgcolor=#E9E9E9
| 101774 ||  || — || March 22, 1999 || Anderson Mesa || LONEOS || — || align=right | 4.1 km || 
|-id=775 bgcolor=#E9E9E9
| 101775 || 1999 GT || — || April 5, 1999 || Višnjan Observatory || K. Korlević || — || align=right | 1.8 km || 
|-id=776 bgcolor=#d6d6d6
| 101776 ||  || — || April 7, 1999 || Kitt Peak || Spacewatch || — || align=right | 3.9 km || 
|-id=777 bgcolor=#E9E9E9
| 101777 Robhoskins ||  ||  || April 13, 1999 || Baton Rouge || W. R. Cooney Jr., M. Howard || — || align=right | 4.4 km || 
|-id=778 bgcolor=#E9E9E9
| 101778 ||  || — || April 15, 1999 || Socorro || LINEAR || — || align=right | 5.2 km || 
|-id=779 bgcolor=#E9E9E9
| 101779 ||  || — || April 9, 1999 || Anderson Mesa || LONEOS || — || align=right | 3.3 km || 
|-id=780 bgcolor=#fefefe
| 101780 ||  || — || April 10, 1999 || Anderson Mesa || LONEOS || — || align=right | 1.8 km || 
|-id=781 bgcolor=#E9E9E9
| 101781 Gojira ||  ||  || April 14, 1999 || Goodricke-Pigott || R. A. Tucker || — || align=right | 4.4 km || 
|-id=782 bgcolor=#fefefe
| 101782 ||  || — || April 11, 1999 || Kitt Peak || Spacewatch || — || align=right | 1.2 km || 
|-id=783 bgcolor=#d6d6d6
| 101783 ||  || — || April 14, 1999 || Kitt Peak || Spacewatch || HYG || align=right | 5.6 km || 
|-id=784 bgcolor=#d6d6d6
| 101784 ||  || — || April 14, 1999 || Kitt Peak || Spacewatch || — || align=right | 5.8 km || 
|-id=785 bgcolor=#fefefe
| 101785 ||  || — || April 9, 1999 || Socorro || LINEAR || — || align=right | 1.5 km || 
|-id=786 bgcolor=#E9E9E9
| 101786 ||  || — || April 15, 1999 || Socorro || LINEAR || — || align=right | 7.6 km || 
|-id=787 bgcolor=#E9E9E9
| 101787 ||  || — || April 7, 1999 || Socorro || LINEAR || MAR || align=right | 2.9 km || 
|-id=788 bgcolor=#E9E9E9
| 101788 ||  || — || April 12, 1999 || Socorro || LINEAR || EUN || align=right | 7.6 km || 
|-id=789 bgcolor=#E9E9E9
| 101789 ||  || — || April 6, 1999 || Socorro || LINEAR || — || align=right | 5.1 km || 
|-id=790 bgcolor=#E9E9E9
| 101790 ||  || — || April 12, 1999 || Socorro || LINEAR || — || align=right | 7.2 km || 
|-id=791 bgcolor=#E9E9E9
| 101791 ||  || — || April 12, 1999 || Socorro || LINEAR || — || align=right | 5.1 km || 
|-id=792 bgcolor=#d6d6d6
| 101792 ||  || — || April 12, 1999 || Socorro || LINEAR || — || align=right | 7.4 km || 
|-id=793 bgcolor=#E9E9E9
| 101793 ||  || — || April 7, 1999 || Anderson Mesa || LONEOS || — || align=right | 3.2 km || 
|-id=794 bgcolor=#E9E9E9
| 101794 ||  || — || April 10, 1999 || Anderson Mesa || LONEOS || — || align=right | 3.1 km || 
|-id=795 bgcolor=#FA8072
| 101795 ||  || — || April 22, 1999 || Socorro || LINEAR || unusual || align=right | 5.3 km || 
|-id=796 bgcolor=#E9E9E9
| 101796 ||  || — || April 18, 1999 || Catalina || CSS || MAR || align=right | 3.8 km || 
|-id=797 bgcolor=#fefefe
| 101797 ||  || — || April 18, 1999 || Catalina || CSS || H || align=right data-sort-value="0.98" | 980 m || 
|-id=798 bgcolor=#E9E9E9
| 101798 ||  || — || April 16, 1999 || Kitt Peak || Spacewatch || — || align=right | 4.2 km || 
|-id=799 bgcolor=#E9E9E9
| 101799 ||  || — || April 17, 1999 || Kitt Peak || Spacewatch || — || align=right | 5.6 km || 
|-id=800 bgcolor=#E9E9E9
| 101800 ||  || — || April 19, 1999 || Kitt Peak || Spacewatch || — || align=right | 4.3 km || 
|}

101801–101900 

|-bgcolor=#E9E9E9
| 101801 ||  || — || April 17, 1999 || Socorro || LINEAR || — || align=right | 3.0 km || 
|-id=802 bgcolor=#E9E9E9
| 101802 ||  || — || April 17, 1999 || Socorro || LINEAR || EUN || align=right | 2.8 km || 
|-id=803 bgcolor=#fefefe
| 101803 || 1999 JH || — || May 6, 1999 || Socorro || LINEAR || H || align=right | 1.9 km || 
|-id=804 bgcolor=#fefefe
| 101804 ||  || — || May 10, 1999 || Socorro || LINEAR || — || align=right | 1.5 km || 
|-id=805 bgcolor=#fefefe
| 101805 ||  || — || May 10, 1999 || Socorro || LINEAR || H || align=right | 1.4 km || 
|-id=806 bgcolor=#fefefe
| 101806 ||  || — || May 10, 1999 || Socorro || LINEAR || H || align=right | 1.4 km || 
|-id=807 bgcolor=#E9E9E9
| 101807 ||  || — || May 10, 1999 || Socorro || LINEAR || — || align=right | 6.3 km || 
|-id=808 bgcolor=#fefefe
| 101808 ||  || — || May 10, 1999 || Socorro || LINEAR || H || align=right | 1.4 km || 
|-id=809 bgcolor=#fefefe
| 101809 ||  || — || May 12, 1999 || Socorro || LINEAR || H || align=right data-sort-value="0.98" | 980 m || 
|-id=810 bgcolor=#d6d6d6
| 101810 Beiyou ||  ||  || May 8, 1999 || Xinglong || SCAP || EUP || align=right | 8.0 km || 
|-id=811 bgcolor=#FA8072
| 101811 ||  || — || May 14, 1999 || Catalina || CSS || PHO || align=right | 3.1 km || 
|-id=812 bgcolor=#E9E9E9
| 101812 ||  || — || May 8, 1999 || Catalina || CSS || — || align=right | 3.6 km || 
|-id=813 bgcolor=#fefefe
| 101813 Elizabethmarston ||  ||  || May 14, 1999 || Goodricke-Pigott || R. A. Tucker || H || align=right | 1.5 km || 
|-id=814 bgcolor=#d6d6d6
| 101814 ||  || — || May 12, 1999 || Socorro || LINEAR || Tj (2.9) || align=right | 4.5 km || 
|-id=815 bgcolor=#fefefe
| 101815 ||  || — || May 13, 1999 || Socorro || LINEAR || H || align=right | 1.5 km || 
|-id=816 bgcolor=#E9E9E9
| 101816 ||  || — || May 8, 1999 || Catalina || CSS || — || align=right | 7.0 km || 
|-id=817 bgcolor=#E9E9E9
| 101817 ||  || — || May 8, 1999 || Catalina || CSS || GEF || align=right | 3.1 km || 
|-id=818 bgcolor=#FA8072
| 101818 ||  || — || May 14, 1999 || Mauna Kea || D. J. Tholen, R. J. Whiteley || — || align=right | 1.4 km || 
|-id=819 bgcolor=#E9E9E9
| 101819 ||  || — || May 8, 1999 || Socorro || LINEAR || — || align=right | 11 km || 
|-id=820 bgcolor=#fefefe
| 101820 ||  || — || May 13, 1999 || Socorro || LINEAR || H || align=right | 1.5 km || 
|-id=821 bgcolor=#fefefe
| 101821 ||  || — || May 13, 1999 || Socorro || LINEAR || H || align=right | 1.6 km || 
|-id=822 bgcolor=#fefefe
| 101822 ||  || — || May 15, 1999 || Kitt Peak || Spacewatch || — || align=right | 1.4 km || 
|-id=823 bgcolor=#fefefe
| 101823 ||  || — || May 10, 1999 || Socorro || LINEAR || — || align=right | 4.5 km || 
|-id=824 bgcolor=#E9E9E9
| 101824 ||  || — || May 10, 1999 || Socorro || LINEAR || — || align=right | 3.7 km || 
|-id=825 bgcolor=#fefefe
| 101825 ||  || — || May 10, 1999 || Socorro || LINEAR || NYS || align=right | 1.9 km || 
|-id=826 bgcolor=#E9E9E9
| 101826 ||  || — || May 10, 1999 || Socorro || LINEAR || — || align=right | 4.6 km || 
|-id=827 bgcolor=#E9E9E9
| 101827 ||  || — || May 10, 1999 || Socorro || LINEAR || — || align=right | 3.7 km || 
|-id=828 bgcolor=#E9E9E9
| 101828 ||  || — || May 10, 1999 || Socorro || LINEAR || GEF || align=right | 2.7 km || 
|-id=829 bgcolor=#E9E9E9
| 101829 ||  || — || May 10, 1999 || Socorro || LINEAR || — || align=right | 3.3 km || 
|-id=830 bgcolor=#E9E9E9
| 101830 ||  || — || May 10, 1999 || Socorro || LINEAR || — || align=right | 5.9 km || 
|-id=831 bgcolor=#E9E9E9
| 101831 ||  || — || May 10, 1999 || Socorro || LINEAR || — || align=right | 4.5 km || 
|-id=832 bgcolor=#fefefe
| 101832 ||  || — || May 10, 1999 || Socorro || LINEAR || — || align=right | 2.2 km || 
|-id=833 bgcolor=#d6d6d6
| 101833 ||  || — || May 10, 1999 || Socorro || LINEAR || — || align=right | 4.2 km || 
|-id=834 bgcolor=#E9E9E9
| 101834 ||  || — || May 10, 1999 || Socorro || LINEAR || — || align=right | 4.6 km || 
|-id=835 bgcolor=#E9E9E9
| 101835 ||  || — || May 10, 1999 || Socorro || LINEAR || — || align=right | 6.0 km || 
|-id=836 bgcolor=#fefefe
| 101836 ||  || — || May 10, 1999 || Socorro || LINEAR || V || align=right | 3.0 km || 
|-id=837 bgcolor=#E9E9E9
| 101837 ||  || — || May 10, 1999 || Socorro || LINEAR || — || align=right | 1.8 km || 
|-id=838 bgcolor=#E9E9E9
| 101838 ||  || — || May 10, 1999 || Socorro || LINEAR || — || align=right | 2.0 km || 
|-id=839 bgcolor=#fefefe
| 101839 ||  || — || May 12, 1999 || Socorro || LINEAR || NYS || align=right | 1.4 km || 
|-id=840 bgcolor=#fefefe
| 101840 ||  || — || May 12, 1999 || Socorro || LINEAR || ERI || align=right | 4.0 km || 
|-id=841 bgcolor=#d6d6d6
| 101841 ||  || — || May 12, 1999 || Socorro || LINEAR || — || align=right | 8.4 km || 
|-id=842 bgcolor=#E9E9E9
| 101842 ||  || — || May 12, 1999 || Socorro || LINEAR || — || align=right | 4.0 km || 
|-id=843 bgcolor=#E9E9E9
| 101843 ||  || — || May 12, 1999 || Socorro || LINEAR || GEF || align=right | 3.6 km || 
|-id=844 bgcolor=#fefefe
| 101844 ||  || — || May 12, 1999 || Socorro || LINEAR || FLO || align=right | 1.2 km || 
|-id=845 bgcolor=#E9E9E9
| 101845 ||  || — || May 12, 1999 || Socorro || LINEAR || — || align=right | 3.9 km || 
|-id=846 bgcolor=#d6d6d6
| 101846 ||  || — || May 12, 1999 || Socorro || LINEAR || — || align=right | 8.3 km || 
|-id=847 bgcolor=#E9E9E9
| 101847 ||  || — || May 12, 1999 || Socorro || LINEAR || — || align=right | 2.7 km || 
|-id=848 bgcolor=#fefefe
| 101848 ||  || — || May 12, 1999 || Socorro || LINEAR || — || align=right | 1.2 km || 
|-id=849 bgcolor=#d6d6d6
| 101849 ||  || — || May 12, 1999 || Socorro || LINEAR || — || align=right | 4.3 km || 
|-id=850 bgcolor=#E9E9E9
| 101850 ||  || — || May 12, 1999 || Socorro || LINEAR || ADE || align=right | 7.8 km || 
|-id=851 bgcolor=#d6d6d6
| 101851 ||  || — || May 12, 1999 || Socorro || LINEAR || — || align=right | 5.9 km || 
|-id=852 bgcolor=#E9E9E9
| 101852 ||  || — || May 12, 1999 || Socorro || LINEAR || — || align=right | 2.2 km || 
|-id=853 bgcolor=#fefefe
| 101853 ||  || — || May 13, 1999 || Socorro || LINEAR || V || align=right | 1.3 km || 
|-id=854 bgcolor=#fefefe
| 101854 ||  || — || May 13, 1999 || Socorro || LINEAR || — || align=right | 1.4 km || 
|-id=855 bgcolor=#fefefe
| 101855 ||  || — || May 13, 1999 || Socorro || LINEAR || NYS || align=right | 3.9 km || 
|-id=856 bgcolor=#d6d6d6
| 101856 ||  || — || May 13, 1999 || Socorro || LINEAR || — || align=right | 6.8 km || 
|-id=857 bgcolor=#d6d6d6
| 101857 ||  || — || May 13, 1999 || Socorro || LINEAR || — || align=right | 7.4 km || 
|-id=858 bgcolor=#d6d6d6
| 101858 ||  || — || May 18, 1999 || Socorro || LINEAR || — || align=right | 5.5 km || 
|-id=859 bgcolor=#fefefe
| 101859 || 1999 LA || — || June 2, 1999 || Woomera || F. B. Zoltowski || — || align=right | 1.3 km || 
|-id=860 bgcolor=#fefefe
| 101860 ||  || — || June 8, 1999 || Socorro || LINEAR || H || align=right | 1.1 km || 
|-id=861 bgcolor=#fefefe
| 101861 ||  || — || June 9, 1999 || Socorro || LINEAR || H || align=right | 1.7 km || 
|-id=862 bgcolor=#fefefe
| 101862 ||  || — || June 10, 1999 || Socorro || LINEAR || H || align=right | 1.0 km || 
|-id=863 bgcolor=#fefefe
| 101863 ||  || — || June 11, 1999 || Socorro || LINEAR || — || align=right | 1.8 km || 
|-id=864 bgcolor=#d6d6d6
| 101864 ||  || — || June 10, 1999 || Kitt Peak || Spacewatch || — || align=right | 5.2 km || 
|-id=865 bgcolor=#fefefe
| 101865 ||  || — || June 8, 1999 || Socorro || LINEAR || — || align=right | 1.2 km || 
|-id=866 bgcolor=#fefefe
| 101866 ||  || — || June 12, 1999 || Socorro || LINEAR || H || align=right | 1.3 km || 
|-id=867 bgcolor=#fefefe
| 101867 ||  || — || June 12, 1999 || Socorro || LINEAR || PHO || align=right | 2.8 km || 
|-id=868 bgcolor=#fefefe
| 101868 ||  || — || June 15, 1999 || Socorro || LINEAR || — || align=right | 1.6 km || 
|-id=869 bgcolor=#FFC2E0
| 101869 || 1999 MM || — || June 20, 1999 || Anderson Mesa || LONEOS || APOPHAcritical || align=right data-sort-value="0.51" | 510 m || 
|-id=870 bgcolor=#d6d6d6
| 101870 || 1999 NV || — || July 7, 1999 || Višnjan Observatory || K. Korlević || — || align=right | 4.6 km || 
|-id=871 bgcolor=#fefefe
| 101871 ||  || — || July 12, 1999 || Socorro || LINEAR || — || align=right | 5.5 km || 
|-id=872 bgcolor=#fefefe
| 101872 ||  || — || July 13, 1999 || Reedy Creek || J. Broughton || FLO || align=right | 1.3 km || 
|-id=873 bgcolor=#FFC2E0
| 101873 ||  || — || July 13, 1999 || Socorro || LINEAR || AMO +1km || align=right | 1.9 km || 
|-id=874 bgcolor=#fefefe
| 101874 ||  || — || July 13, 1999 || Socorro || LINEAR || FLO || align=right | 1.3 km || 
|-id=875 bgcolor=#fefefe
| 101875 ||  || — || July 13, 1999 || Socorro || LINEAR || FLO || align=right | 1.4 km || 
|-id=876 bgcolor=#E9E9E9
| 101876 ||  || — || July 14, 1999 || Socorro || LINEAR || — || align=right | 2.3 km || 
|-id=877 bgcolor=#fefefe
| 101877 ||  || — || July 14, 1999 || Socorro || LINEAR || — || align=right | 1.3 km || 
|-id=878 bgcolor=#fefefe
| 101878 ||  || — || July 14, 1999 || Socorro || LINEAR || — || align=right | 1.3 km || 
|-id=879 bgcolor=#fefefe
| 101879 ||  || — || July 14, 1999 || Socorro || LINEAR || FLO || align=right | 1.6 km || 
|-id=880 bgcolor=#E9E9E9
| 101880 ||  || — || July 14, 1999 || Socorro || LINEAR || JUN || align=right | 2.0 km || 
|-id=881 bgcolor=#fefefe
| 101881 ||  || — || July 14, 1999 || Socorro || LINEAR || — || align=right | 1.6 km || 
|-id=882 bgcolor=#fefefe
| 101882 ||  || — || July 14, 1999 || Socorro || LINEAR || — || align=right | 1.8 km || 
|-id=883 bgcolor=#fefefe
| 101883 ||  || — || July 14, 1999 || Socorro || LINEAR || — || align=right | 3.8 km || 
|-id=884 bgcolor=#fefefe
| 101884 ||  || — || July 14, 1999 || Socorro || LINEAR || NYS || align=right | 1.1 km || 
|-id=885 bgcolor=#d6d6d6
| 101885 ||  || — || July 14, 1999 || Socorro || LINEAR || — || align=right | 9.9 km || 
|-id=886 bgcolor=#d6d6d6
| 101886 ||  || — || July 14, 1999 || Socorro || LINEAR || — || align=right | 9.9 km || 
|-id=887 bgcolor=#fefefe
| 101887 ||  || — || July 14, 1999 || Socorro || LINEAR || NYS || align=right | 1.8 km || 
|-id=888 bgcolor=#fefefe
| 101888 ||  || — || July 14, 1999 || Socorro || LINEAR || — || align=right | 1.8 km || 
|-id=889 bgcolor=#d6d6d6
| 101889 ||  || — || July 12, 1999 || Socorro || LINEAR || ALA || align=right | 10 km || 
|-id=890 bgcolor=#d6d6d6
| 101890 ||  || — || July 12, 1999 || Socorro || LINEAR || Tj (2.98) || align=right | 16 km || 
|-id=891 bgcolor=#d6d6d6
| 101891 ||  || — || July 12, 1999 || Socorro || LINEAR || — || align=right | 6.7 km || 
|-id=892 bgcolor=#fefefe
| 101892 ||  || — || July 14, 1999 || Socorro || LINEAR || — || align=right | 3.7 km || 
|-id=893 bgcolor=#fefefe
| 101893 || 1999 PJ || — || August 6, 1999 || Kleť || Kleť Obs. || NYS || align=right | 1.3 km || 
|-id=894 bgcolor=#d6d6d6
| 101894 ||  || — || August 9, 1999 || Prescott || P. G. Comba || — || align=right | 7.3 km || 
|-id=895 bgcolor=#fefefe
| 101895 ||  || — || August 11, 1999 || Prescott || P. G. Comba || — || align=right | 1.9 km || 
|-id=896 bgcolor=#fefefe
| 101896 ||  || — || August 12, 1999 || Prescott || P. G. Comba || FLO || align=right | 1.1 km || 
|-id=897 bgcolor=#E9E9E9
| 101897 ||  || — || August 15, 1999 || Reedy Creek || J. Broughton || — || align=right | 6.5 km || 
|-id=898 bgcolor=#fefefe
| 101898 ||  || — || August 7, 1999 || Anderson Mesa || LONEOS || FLO || align=right | 1.1 km || 
|-id=899 bgcolor=#fefefe
| 101899 ||  || — || August 8, 1999 || Anderson Mesa || LONEOS || — || align=right | 1.5 km || 
|-id=900 bgcolor=#fefefe
| 101900 || 1999 QH || — || August 18, 1999 || Gekko || T. Kagawa || — || align=right | 3.4 km || 
|}

101901–102000 

|-bgcolor=#FA8072
| 101901 ||  || — || August 22, 1999 || Anderson Mesa || LONEOS || — || align=right | 1.1 km || 
|-id=902 bgcolor=#fefefe
| 101902 Gisellaluccone || 1999 RN ||  || September 3, 1999 || Ceccano || G. Masi || — || align=right | 2.1 km || 
|-id=903 bgcolor=#d6d6d6
| 101903 || 1999 RR || — || September 3, 1999 || Ondřejov || L. Kotková || — || align=right | 7.7 km || 
|-id=904 bgcolor=#fefefe
| 101904 ||  || — || September 4, 1999 || Gekko || T. Kagawa || — || align=right | 1.8 km || 
|-id=905 bgcolor=#fefefe
| 101905 ||  || — || September 4, 1999 || Farpoint || Farpoint Obs. || NYS || align=right | 1.3 km || 
|-id=906 bgcolor=#fefefe
| 101906 ||  || — || September 6, 1999 || Višnjan Observatory || K. Korlević || NYS || align=right | 1.9 km || 
|-id=907 bgcolor=#d6d6d6
| 101907 ||  || — || September 6, 1999 || Višnjan Observatory || K. Korlević || — || align=right | 7.3 km || 
|-id=908 bgcolor=#d6d6d6
| 101908 ||  || — || September 5, 1999 || Catalina || CSS || — || align=right | 7.3 km || 
|-id=909 bgcolor=#fefefe
| 101909 ||  || — || September 3, 1999 || Kitt Peak || Spacewatch || — || align=right | 1.4 km || 
|-id=910 bgcolor=#fefefe
| 101910 ||  || — || September 4, 1999 || Kitt Peak || Spacewatch || — || align=right | 2.1 km || 
|-id=911 bgcolor=#d6d6d6
| 101911 ||  || — || September 4, 1999 || Kitt Peak || Spacewatch || ALA || align=right | 6.7 km || 
|-id=912 bgcolor=#fefefe
| 101912 ||  || — || September 7, 1999 || Socorro || LINEAR || — || align=right | 1.1 km || 
|-id=913 bgcolor=#fefefe
| 101913 ||  || — || September 7, 1999 || Socorro || LINEAR || NYS || align=right | 1.2 km || 
|-id=914 bgcolor=#fefefe
| 101914 ||  || — || September 7, 1999 || Socorro || LINEAR || — || align=right | 1.4 km || 
|-id=915 bgcolor=#fefefe
| 101915 ||  || — || September 7, 1999 || Socorro || LINEAR || FLO || align=right | 1.3 km || 
|-id=916 bgcolor=#fefefe
| 101916 ||  || — || September 7, 1999 || Socorro || LINEAR || EUT || align=right | 1.7 km || 
|-id=917 bgcolor=#d6d6d6
| 101917 ||  || — || September 7, 1999 || Socorro || LINEAR || — || align=right | 4.3 km || 
|-id=918 bgcolor=#fefefe
| 101918 ||  || — || September 7, 1999 || Socorro || LINEAR || — || align=right | 1.8 km || 
|-id=919 bgcolor=#fefefe
| 101919 ||  || — || September 7, 1999 || Socorro || LINEAR || NYS || align=right | 1.4 km || 
|-id=920 bgcolor=#fefefe
| 101920 ||  || — || September 7, 1999 || Socorro || LINEAR || V || align=right | 1.5 km || 
|-id=921 bgcolor=#d6d6d6
| 101921 ||  || — || September 7, 1999 || Socorro || LINEAR || VER || align=right | 8.8 km || 
|-id=922 bgcolor=#fefefe
| 101922 ||  || — || September 7, 1999 || Socorro || LINEAR || FLO || align=right | 1.5 km || 
|-id=923 bgcolor=#fefefe
| 101923 ||  || — || September 7, 1999 || Socorro || LINEAR || NYS || align=right | 1.6 km || 
|-id=924 bgcolor=#fefefe
| 101924 ||  || — || September 7, 1999 || Socorro || LINEAR || V || align=right | 1.4 km || 
|-id=925 bgcolor=#fefefe
| 101925 ||  || — || September 7, 1999 || Socorro || LINEAR || — || align=right | 1.8 km || 
|-id=926 bgcolor=#d6d6d6
| 101926 ||  || — || September 7, 1999 || Socorro || LINEAR || — || align=right | 5.3 km || 
|-id=927 bgcolor=#d6d6d6
| 101927 ||  || — || September 7, 1999 || Socorro || LINEAR || THM || align=right | 7.1 km || 
|-id=928 bgcolor=#fefefe
| 101928 ||  || — || September 7, 1999 || Socorro || LINEAR || FLO || align=right | 1.4 km || 
|-id=929 bgcolor=#d6d6d6
| 101929 ||  || — || September 7, 1999 || Socorro || LINEAR || URS || align=right | 6.9 km || 
|-id=930 bgcolor=#fefefe
| 101930 ||  || — || September 7, 1999 || Socorro || LINEAR || — || align=right | 4.2 km || 
|-id=931 bgcolor=#FA8072
| 101931 ||  || — || September 7, 1999 || Socorro || LINEAR || — || align=right | 1.3 km || 
|-id=932 bgcolor=#fefefe
| 101932 ||  || — || September 7, 1999 || Socorro || LINEAR || — || align=right | 1.8 km || 
|-id=933 bgcolor=#fefefe
| 101933 ||  || — || September 7, 1999 || Socorro || LINEAR || — || align=right | 1.7 km || 
|-id=934 bgcolor=#fefefe
| 101934 ||  || — || September 7, 1999 || Socorro || LINEAR || — || align=right | 1.8 km || 
|-id=935 bgcolor=#fefefe
| 101935 ||  || — || September 7, 1999 || Socorro || LINEAR || — || align=right | 4.9 km || 
|-id=936 bgcolor=#fefefe
| 101936 ||  || — || September 7, 1999 || Socorro || LINEAR || — || align=right | 4.5 km || 
|-id=937 bgcolor=#fefefe
| 101937 ||  || — || September 7, 1999 || Socorro || LINEAR || PHO || align=right | 2.4 km || 
|-id=938 bgcolor=#fefefe
| 101938 ||  || — || September 7, 1999 || Socorro || LINEAR || PHO || align=right | 2.6 km || 
|-id=939 bgcolor=#fefefe
| 101939 ||  || — || September 7, 1999 || Socorro || LINEAR || — || align=right | 1.4 km || 
|-id=940 bgcolor=#fefefe
| 101940 ||  || — || September 7, 1999 || Socorro || LINEAR || — || align=right | 1.8 km || 
|-id=941 bgcolor=#fefefe
| 101941 ||  || — || September 7, 1999 || Socorro || LINEAR || — || align=right | 2.0 km || 
|-id=942 bgcolor=#fefefe
| 101942 ||  || — || September 7, 1999 || Socorro || LINEAR || — || align=right | 1.9 km || 
|-id=943 bgcolor=#fefefe
| 101943 ||  || — || September 7, 1999 || Socorro || LINEAR || — || align=right | 2.7 km || 
|-id=944 bgcolor=#E9E9E9
| 101944 ||  || — || September 7, 1999 || Socorro || LINEAR || — || align=right | 2.2 km || 
|-id=945 bgcolor=#d6d6d6
| 101945 ||  || — || September 7, 1999 || Socorro || LINEAR || Tj (2.95) || align=right | 7.4 km || 
|-id=946 bgcolor=#d6d6d6
| 101946 ||  || — || September 7, 1999 || Socorro || LINEAR || — || align=right | 3.4 km || 
|-id=947 bgcolor=#fefefe
| 101947 ||  || — || September 7, 1999 || Socorro || LINEAR || — || align=right | 1.8 km || 
|-id=948 bgcolor=#fefefe
| 101948 ||  || — || September 7, 1999 || Socorro || LINEAR || MAS || align=right | 1.5 km || 
|-id=949 bgcolor=#fefefe
| 101949 ||  || — || September 7, 1999 || Socorro || LINEAR || — || align=right | 1.5 km || 
|-id=950 bgcolor=#d6d6d6
| 101950 ||  || — || September 7, 1999 || Socorro || LINEAR || Tj (2.94) || align=right | 7.3 km || 
|-id=951 bgcolor=#fefefe
| 101951 ||  || — || September 9, 1999 || Višnjan Observatory || K. Korlević || FLO || align=right | 1.7 km || 
|-id=952 bgcolor=#FA8072
| 101952 ||  || — || September 8, 1999 || Catalina || CSS || — || align=right | 1.7 km || 
|-id=953 bgcolor=#fefefe
| 101953 ||  || — || September 9, 1999 || Višnjan Observatory || K. Korlević || V || align=right | 1.7 km || 
|-id=954 bgcolor=#d6d6d6
| 101954 ||  || — || September 10, 1999 || Socorro || LINEAR || EUPfast || align=right | 5.2 km || 
|-id=955 bgcolor=#FFC2E0
| 101955 Bennu ||  ||  || September 11, 1999 || Socorro || LINEAR || APOPHA || align=right data-sort-value="0.49" | 490 m || 
|-id=956 bgcolor=#fefefe
| 101956 ||  || — || September 11, 1999 || Višnjan Observatory || K. Korlević || FLO || align=right | 1.7 km || 
|-id=957 bgcolor=#E9E9E9
| 101957 ||  || — || September 12, 1999 || Višnjan Observatory || K. Korlević || JUN || align=right | 2.2 km || 
|-id=958 bgcolor=#E9E9E9
| 101958 ||  || — || September 12, 1999 || Farra d'Isonzo || Farra d'Isonzo || — || align=right | 4.0 km || 
|-id=959 bgcolor=#fefefe
| 101959 ||  || — || September 13, 1999 || Višnjan Observatory || K. Korlević || FLO || align=right | 1.8 km || 
|-id=960 bgcolor=#fefefe
| 101960 Molau ||  ||  || September 11, 1999 || Drebach || A. Knöfel || EUT || align=right data-sort-value="0.98" | 980 m || 
|-id=961 bgcolor=#FA8072
| 101961 ||  || — || September 8, 1999 || Catalina || CSS || — || align=right | 1.9 km || 
|-id=962 bgcolor=#fefefe
| 101962 ||  || — || September 12, 1999 || Catalina || CSS || — || align=right | 2.4 km || 
|-id=963 bgcolor=#fefefe
| 101963 ||  || — || September 15, 1999 || Kleť || Kleť Obs. || NYS || align=right | 1.1 km || 
|-id=964 bgcolor=#E9E9E9
| 101964 ||  || — || September 13, 1999 || Višnjan Observatory || K. Korlević || — || align=right | 3.8 km || 
|-id=965 bgcolor=#d6d6d6
| 101965 ||  || — || September 13, 1999 || Višnjan Observatory || K. Korlević || Tj (2.94) || align=right | 10 km || 
|-id=966 bgcolor=#fefefe
| 101966 ||  || — || September 14, 1999 || Modra || A. Galád, P. Kolény || — || align=right | 2.2 km || 
|-id=967 bgcolor=#FA8072
| 101967 ||  || — || September 13, 1999 || Fountain Hills || C. W. Juels || — || align=right | 2.0 km || 
|-id=968 bgcolor=#fefefe
| 101968 ||  || — || September 7, 1999 || Socorro || LINEAR || — || align=right | 1.8 km || 
|-id=969 bgcolor=#FA8072
| 101969 ||  || — || September 13, 1999 || Siding Spring || R. H. McNaught || — || align=right | 5.8 km || 
|-id=970 bgcolor=#E9E9E9
| 101970 ||  || — || September 7, 1999 || Socorro || LINEAR || — || align=right | 4.1 km || 
|-id=971 bgcolor=#fefefe
| 101971 ||  || — || September 7, 1999 || Socorro || LINEAR || FLO || align=right | 1.5 km || 
|-id=972 bgcolor=#E9E9E9
| 101972 ||  || — || September 7, 1999 || Socorro || LINEAR || — || align=right | 3.3 km || 
|-id=973 bgcolor=#fefefe
| 101973 ||  || — || September 7, 1999 || Socorro || LINEAR || — || align=right | 1.6 km || 
|-id=974 bgcolor=#fefefe
| 101974 ||  || — || September 7, 1999 || Socorro || LINEAR || — || align=right | 1.2 km || 
|-id=975 bgcolor=#fefefe
| 101975 ||  || — || September 7, 1999 || Socorro || LINEAR || — || align=right | 1.9 km || 
|-id=976 bgcolor=#fefefe
| 101976 ||  || — || September 7, 1999 || Socorro || LINEAR || — || align=right | 1.4 km || 
|-id=977 bgcolor=#fefefe
| 101977 ||  || — || September 7, 1999 || Socorro || LINEAR || — || align=right | 1.9 km || 
|-id=978 bgcolor=#fefefe
| 101978 ||  || — || September 7, 1999 || Socorro || LINEAR || — || align=right | 1.8 km || 
|-id=979 bgcolor=#d6d6d6
| 101979 ||  || — || September 7, 1999 || Socorro || LINEAR || HYG || align=right | 5.0 km || 
|-id=980 bgcolor=#fefefe
| 101980 ||  || — || September 7, 1999 || Socorro || LINEAR || — || align=right | 1.9 km || 
|-id=981 bgcolor=#E9E9E9
| 101981 ||  || — || September 7, 1999 || Socorro || LINEAR || — || align=right | 1.8 km || 
|-id=982 bgcolor=#fefefe
| 101982 ||  || — || September 7, 1999 || Socorro || LINEAR || — || align=right | 1.3 km || 
|-id=983 bgcolor=#fefefe
| 101983 ||  || — || September 7, 1999 || Socorro || LINEAR || — || align=right | 1.8 km || 
|-id=984 bgcolor=#E9E9E9
| 101984 ||  || — || September 7, 1999 || Socorro || LINEAR || HEN || align=right | 2.3 km || 
|-id=985 bgcolor=#fefefe
| 101985 ||  || — || September 7, 1999 || Socorro || LINEAR || — || align=right | 1.6 km || 
|-id=986 bgcolor=#fefefe
| 101986 ||  || — || September 7, 1999 || Socorro || LINEAR || — || align=right | 1.4 km || 
|-id=987 bgcolor=#E9E9E9
| 101987 ||  || — || September 7, 1999 || Socorro || LINEAR || — || align=right | 3.0 km || 
|-id=988 bgcolor=#d6d6d6
| 101988 ||  || — || September 7, 1999 || Socorro || LINEAR || — || align=right | 5.2 km || 
|-id=989 bgcolor=#fefefe
| 101989 ||  || — || September 7, 1999 || Socorro || LINEAR || V || align=right | 1.2 km || 
|-id=990 bgcolor=#fefefe
| 101990 ||  || — || September 7, 1999 || Socorro || LINEAR || — || align=right | 1.5 km || 
|-id=991 bgcolor=#fefefe
| 101991 ||  || — || September 7, 1999 || Socorro || LINEAR || — || align=right | 1.6 km || 
|-id=992 bgcolor=#d6d6d6
| 101992 ||  || — || September 7, 1999 || Socorro || LINEAR || ALA || align=right | 6.7 km || 
|-id=993 bgcolor=#fefefe
| 101993 ||  || — || September 7, 1999 || Socorro || LINEAR || — || align=right | 1.7 km || 
|-id=994 bgcolor=#E9E9E9
| 101994 ||  || — || September 7, 1999 || Socorro || LINEAR || — || align=right | 1.6 km || 
|-id=995 bgcolor=#fefefe
| 101995 ||  || — || September 7, 1999 || Socorro || LINEAR || — || align=right | 1.6 km || 
|-id=996 bgcolor=#fefefe
| 101996 ||  || — || September 7, 1999 || Socorro || LINEAR || — || align=right | 1.8 km || 
|-id=997 bgcolor=#fefefe
| 101997 ||  || — || September 7, 1999 || Socorro || LINEAR || — || align=right | 2.0 km || 
|-id=998 bgcolor=#fefefe
| 101998 ||  || — || September 7, 1999 || Socorro || LINEAR || — || align=right | 1.9 km || 
|-id=999 bgcolor=#fefefe
| 101999 ||  || — || September 7, 1999 || Socorro || LINEAR || — || align=right | 2.1 km || 
|-id=000 bgcolor=#E9E9E9
| 102000 ||  || — || September 7, 1999 || Socorro || LINEAR || — || align=right | 1.6 km || 
|}

References

External links 
 Discovery Circumstances: Numbered Minor Planets (100001)–(105000) (IAU Minor Planet Center)

0101